

379001–379100 

|-bgcolor=#d6d6d6
| 379001 ||  || — || March 16, 2005 || Mount Lemmon || Mount Lemmon Survey || — || align=right | 2.9 km || 
|-id=002 bgcolor=#d6d6d6
| 379002 ||  || — || October 23, 2008 || Kitt Peak || Spacewatch || — || align=right | 2.2 km || 
|-id=003 bgcolor=#d6d6d6
| 379003 ||  || — || October 24, 2008 || Kitt Peak || Spacewatch || — || align=right | 2.1 km || 
|-id=004 bgcolor=#d6d6d6
| 379004 ||  || — || October 30, 2008 || Kitt Peak || Spacewatch || — || align=right | 2.0 km || 
|-id=005 bgcolor=#d6d6d6
| 379005 ||  || — || October 30, 2008 || Kitt Peak || Spacewatch || — || align=right | 3.6 km || 
|-id=006 bgcolor=#d6d6d6
| 379006 ||  || — || October 31, 2008 || Mount Lemmon || Mount Lemmon Survey || — || align=right | 3.4 km || 
|-id=007 bgcolor=#d6d6d6
| 379007 ||  || — || October 23, 2008 || Kitt Peak || Spacewatch || — || align=right | 2.9 km || 
|-id=008 bgcolor=#d6d6d6
| 379008 ||  || — || October 27, 2008 || Mount Lemmon || Mount Lemmon Survey || — || align=right | 2.8 km || 
|-id=009 bgcolor=#d6d6d6
| 379009 ||  || — || October 22, 2008 || Kitt Peak || Spacewatch || — || align=right | 2.3 km || 
|-id=010 bgcolor=#d6d6d6
| 379010 ||  || — || October 30, 2008 || Kitt Peak || Spacewatch || — || align=right | 3.7 km || 
|-id=011 bgcolor=#d6d6d6
| 379011 ||  || — || October 22, 2008 || Kitt Peak || Spacewatch || CRO || align=right | 4.4 km || 
|-id=012 bgcolor=#d6d6d6
| 379012 ||  || — || October 24, 2008 || Catalina || CSS || — || align=right | 3.7 km || 
|-id=013 bgcolor=#d6d6d6
| 379013 ||  || — || October 27, 2008 || Mount Lemmon || Mount Lemmon Survey || THM || align=right | 2.4 km || 
|-id=014 bgcolor=#E9E9E9
| 379014 ||  || — || October 26, 2008 || Kitt Peak || Spacewatch || GEF || align=right | 1.7 km || 
|-id=015 bgcolor=#d6d6d6
| 379015 ||  || — || October 27, 2008 || Mount Lemmon || Mount Lemmon Survey || — || align=right | 3.1 km || 
|-id=016 bgcolor=#fefefe
| 379016 ||  || — || November 4, 2008 || Socorro || LINEAR || H || align=right | 1.1 km || 
|-id=017 bgcolor=#E9E9E9
| 379017 ||  || — || November 2, 2008 || Mount Lemmon || Mount Lemmon Survey || INO || align=right | 1.4 km || 
|-id=018 bgcolor=#d6d6d6
| 379018 ||  || — || November 1, 2008 || Kitt Peak || Spacewatch || KOR || align=right | 1.5 km || 
|-id=019 bgcolor=#d6d6d6
| 379019 ||  || — || November 1, 2008 || Mount Lemmon || Mount Lemmon Survey || — || align=right | 3.0 km || 
|-id=020 bgcolor=#d6d6d6
| 379020 ||  || — || November 1, 2008 || Kitt Peak || Spacewatch || HYG || align=right | 3.8 km || 
|-id=021 bgcolor=#d6d6d6
| 379021 ||  || — || November 2, 2008 || Mount Lemmon || Mount Lemmon Survey || — || align=right | 5.8 km || 
|-id=022 bgcolor=#d6d6d6
| 379022 ||  || — || November 2, 2008 || Kitt Peak || Spacewatch || EOS || align=right | 2.1 km || 
|-id=023 bgcolor=#d6d6d6
| 379023 ||  || — || October 25, 2008 || Kitt Peak || Spacewatch || EOS || align=right | 1.9 km || 
|-id=024 bgcolor=#d6d6d6
| 379024 ||  || — || November 2, 2008 || Kitt Peak || Spacewatch || — || align=right | 1.8 km || 
|-id=025 bgcolor=#d6d6d6
| 379025 ||  || — || November 2, 2008 || Kitt Peak || Spacewatch || — || align=right | 2.3 km || 
|-id=026 bgcolor=#d6d6d6
| 379026 ||  || — || November 2, 2008 || Mount Lemmon || Mount Lemmon Survey || — || align=right | 4.7 km || 
|-id=027 bgcolor=#d6d6d6
| 379027 ||  || — || November 3, 2008 || Mount Lemmon || Mount Lemmon Survey || — || align=right | 2.0 km || 
|-id=028 bgcolor=#d6d6d6
| 379028 ||  || — || November 3, 2008 || Kitt Peak || Spacewatch || — || align=right | 4.4 km || 
|-id=029 bgcolor=#d6d6d6
| 379029 ||  || — || November 5, 2008 || Kitt Peak || Spacewatch || — || align=right | 2.4 km || 
|-id=030 bgcolor=#d6d6d6
| 379030 ||  || — || November 7, 2008 || Mount Lemmon || Mount Lemmon Survey || EOS || align=right | 2.3 km || 
|-id=031 bgcolor=#d6d6d6
| 379031 ||  || — || October 20, 2008 || Kitt Peak || Spacewatch || KOR || align=right | 1.4 km || 
|-id=032 bgcolor=#d6d6d6
| 379032 ||  || — || November 8, 2008 || Kitt Peak || Spacewatch || — || align=right | 2.2 km || 
|-id=033 bgcolor=#d6d6d6
| 379033 ||  || — || November 8, 2008 || Kitt Peak || Spacewatch || VER || align=right | 3.3 km || 
|-id=034 bgcolor=#d6d6d6
| 379034 ||  || — || March 11, 2005 || Mount Lemmon || Mount Lemmon Survey || — || align=right | 3.2 km || 
|-id=035 bgcolor=#d6d6d6
| 379035 ||  || — || November 7, 2008 || Catalina || CSS || HYG || align=right | 3.8 km || 
|-id=036 bgcolor=#d6d6d6
| 379036 ||  || — || November 2, 2008 || Mount Lemmon || Mount Lemmon Survey || — || align=right | 3.2 km || 
|-id=037 bgcolor=#d6d6d6
| 379037 ||  || — || November 17, 2008 || Kitt Peak || Spacewatch || THM || align=right | 2.7 km || 
|-id=038 bgcolor=#fefefe
| 379038 ||  || — || November 19, 2008 || Socorro || LINEAR || H || align=right data-sort-value="0.50" | 500 m || 
|-id=039 bgcolor=#d6d6d6
| 379039 ||  || — || November 17, 2008 || Kitt Peak || Spacewatch || KOR || align=right | 1.6 km || 
|-id=040 bgcolor=#d6d6d6
| 379040 ||  || — || November 17, 2008 || Kitt Peak || Spacewatch || — || align=right | 2.4 km || 
|-id=041 bgcolor=#d6d6d6
| 379041 ||  || — || November 17, 2008 || Kitt Peak || Spacewatch || K-2 || align=right | 1.4 km || 
|-id=042 bgcolor=#d6d6d6
| 379042 ||  || — || October 20, 2008 || Kitt Peak || Spacewatch || — || align=right | 2.9 km || 
|-id=043 bgcolor=#d6d6d6
| 379043 ||  || — || November 18, 2008 || Kitt Peak || Spacewatch || KAR || align=right | 1.0 km || 
|-id=044 bgcolor=#d6d6d6
| 379044 ||  || — || November 18, 2008 || Kitt Peak || Spacewatch || KOR || align=right | 1.2 km || 
|-id=045 bgcolor=#d6d6d6
| 379045 ||  || — || October 9, 2008 || Mount Lemmon || Mount Lemmon Survey || — || align=right | 2.9 km || 
|-id=046 bgcolor=#d6d6d6
| 379046 ||  || — || November 19, 2008 || Mount Lemmon || Mount Lemmon Survey || VER || align=right | 4.0 km || 
|-id=047 bgcolor=#d6d6d6
| 379047 ||  || — || November 19, 2008 || Mount Lemmon || Mount Lemmon Survey || — || align=right | 2.2 km || 
|-id=048 bgcolor=#d6d6d6
| 379048 ||  || — || November 21, 2008 || Socorro || LINEAR || — || align=right | 3.4 km || 
|-id=049 bgcolor=#d6d6d6
| 379049 ||  || — || November 17, 2008 || Kitt Peak || Spacewatch || — || align=right | 3.0 km || 
|-id=050 bgcolor=#d6d6d6
| 379050 ||  || — || November 17, 2008 || Kitt Peak || Spacewatch || — || align=right | 2.7 km || 
|-id=051 bgcolor=#d6d6d6
| 379051 ||  || — || April 8, 2006 || Kitt Peak || Spacewatch || — || align=right | 2.5 km || 
|-id=052 bgcolor=#d6d6d6
| 379052 ||  || — || November 17, 2008 || Kitt Peak || Spacewatch || — || align=right | 5.9 km || 
|-id=053 bgcolor=#d6d6d6
| 379053 ||  || — || October 22, 2008 || Kitt Peak || Spacewatch || — || align=right | 3.2 km || 
|-id=054 bgcolor=#d6d6d6
| 379054 ||  || — || October 23, 2003 || Kitt Peak || Spacewatch || — || align=right | 3.0 km || 
|-id=055 bgcolor=#d6d6d6
| 379055 ||  || — || November 18, 2008 || Catalina || CSS || TRE || align=right | 2.2 km || 
|-id=056 bgcolor=#d6d6d6
| 379056 ||  || — || November 19, 2008 || Kitt Peak || Spacewatch || — || align=right | 2.6 km || 
|-id=057 bgcolor=#d6d6d6
| 379057 ||  || — || November 20, 2008 || Mount Lemmon || Mount Lemmon Survey || — || align=right | 3.2 km || 
|-id=058 bgcolor=#d6d6d6
| 379058 ||  || — || November 18, 2008 || Catalina || CSS || — || align=right | 4.3 km || 
|-id=059 bgcolor=#d6d6d6
| 379059 ||  || — || November 17, 2008 || Catalina || CSS || — || align=right | 3.2 km || 
|-id=060 bgcolor=#d6d6d6
| 379060 ||  || — || October 25, 2008 || Mount Lemmon || Mount Lemmon Survey || — || align=right | 3.1 km || 
|-id=061 bgcolor=#d6d6d6
| 379061 ||  || — || November 19, 2008 || Mount Lemmon || Mount Lemmon Survey || — || align=right | 2.9 km || 
|-id=062 bgcolor=#d6d6d6
| 379062 ||  || — || November 20, 2008 || Kitt Peak || Spacewatch || — || align=right | 3.3 km || 
|-id=063 bgcolor=#d6d6d6
| 379063 ||  || — || November 2, 2008 || Mount Lemmon || Mount Lemmon Survey || — || align=right | 2.7 km || 
|-id=064 bgcolor=#d6d6d6
| 379064 ||  || — || November 20, 2008 || Kitt Peak || Spacewatch || — || align=right | 3.0 km || 
|-id=065 bgcolor=#d6d6d6
| 379065 ||  || — || November 21, 2008 || Kitt Peak || Spacewatch || — || align=right | 2.5 km || 
|-id=066 bgcolor=#d6d6d6
| 379066 ||  || — || November 21, 2008 || Kitt Peak || Spacewatch || — || align=right | 3.7 km || 
|-id=067 bgcolor=#d6d6d6
| 379067 ||  || — || November 24, 2008 || Dauban || F. Kugel || — || align=right | 2.9 km || 
|-id=068 bgcolor=#d6d6d6
| 379068 ||  || — || November 24, 2008 || Dauban || F. Kugel || — || align=right | 4.2 km || 
|-id=069 bgcolor=#d6d6d6
| 379069 ||  || — || October 6, 2008 || Mount Lemmon || Mount Lemmon Survey || CHA || align=right | 2.3 km || 
|-id=070 bgcolor=#d6d6d6
| 379070 ||  || — || November 30, 2008 || Mount Lemmon || Mount Lemmon Survey || 629 || align=right | 1.2 km || 
|-id=071 bgcolor=#d6d6d6
| 379071 ||  || — || November 30, 2008 || Mount Lemmon || Mount Lemmon Survey || KAR || align=right | 1.1 km || 
|-id=072 bgcolor=#d6d6d6
| 379072 ||  || — || November 30, 2008 || Kitt Peak || Spacewatch || — || align=right | 5.2 km || 
|-id=073 bgcolor=#d6d6d6
| 379073 ||  || — || November 30, 2008 || Mount Lemmon || Mount Lemmon Survey || — || align=right | 2.5 km || 
|-id=074 bgcolor=#d6d6d6
| 379074 ||  || — || November 30, 2008 || Mount Lemmon || Mount Lemmon Survey || — || align=right | 4.0 km || 
|-id=075 bgcolor=#d6d6d6
| 379075 ||  || — || November 24, 2008 || Mount Lemmon || Mount Lemmon Survey || HYG || align=right | 2.7 km || 
|-id=076 bgcolor=#d6d6d6
| 379076 ||  || — || November 30, 2008 || Kitt Peak || Spacewatch || — || align=right | 2.7 km || 
|-id=077 bgcolor=#d6d6d6
| 379077 ||  || — || November 21, 2008 || Mount Lemmon || Mount Lemmon Survey || THM || align=right | 2.1 km || 
|-id=078 bgcolor=#d6d6d6
| 379078 ||  || — || November 18, 2008 || Kitt Peak || Spacewatch || — || align=right | 2.6 km || 
|-id=079 bgcolor=#d6d6d6
| 379079 ||  || — || November 19, 2008 || Catalina || CSS || — || align=right | 2.8 km || 
|-id=080 bgcolor=#d6d6d6
| 379080 ||  || — || November 19, 2008 || Kitt Peak || Spacewatch || — || align=right | 3.1 km || 
|-id=081 bgcolor=#d6d6d6
| 379081 ||  || — || November 18, 2008 || Kitt Peak || Spacewatch || — || align=right | 2.6 km || 
|-id=082 bgcolor=#d6d6d6
| 379082 ||  || — || November 22, 2008 || Kitt Peak || Spacewatch || EOS || align=right | 2.7 km || 
|-id=083 bgcolor=#d6d6d6
| 379083 ||  || — || November 24, 2008 || Socorro || LINEAR || — || align=right | 5.0 km || 
|-id=084 bgcolor=#d6d6d6
| 379084 ||  || — || November 21, 2008 || Catalina || CSS || EUP || align=right | 5.6 km || 
|-id=085 bgcolor=#d6d6d6
| 379085 ||  || — || December 4, 2008 || Catalina || CSS || EUP || align=right | 4.5 km || 
|-id=086 bgcolor=#d6d6d6
| 379086 ||  || — || November 7, 2008 || Mount Lemmon || Mount Lemmon Survey || — || align=right | 3.5 km || 
|-id=087 bgcolor=#d6d6d6
| 379087 ||  || — || December 3, 2008 || Mount Lemmon || Mount Lemmon Survey || — || align=right | 2.2 km || 
|-id=088 bgcolor=#d6d6d6
| 379088 ||  || — || November 19, 2008 || Kitt Peak || Spacewatch || HYG || align=right | 3.2 km || 
|-id=089 bgcolor=#d6d6d6
| 379089 ||  || — || December 1, 2008 || Kitt Peak || Spacewatch || — || align=right | 3.4 km || 
|-id=090 bgcolor=#d6d6d6
| 379090 ||  || — || April 25, 2000 || Kitt Peak || Spacewatch || CRO || align=right | 2.8 km || 
|-id=091 bgcolor=#d6d6d6
| 379091 ||  || — || December 4, 2008 || Kitt Peak || Spacewatch || VER || align=right | 3.1 km || 
|-id=092 bgcolor=#d6d6d6
| 379092 ||  || — || December 2, 2008 || Kitt Peak || Spacewatch || — || align=right | 2.4 km || 
|-id=093 bgcolor=#d6d6d6
| 379093 ||  || — || December 3, 2008 || Kitt Peak || Spacewatch || — || align=right | 3.0 km || 
|-id=094 bgcolor=#d6d6d6
| 379094 ||  || — || December 6, 2008 || Mount Lemmon || Mount Lemmon Survey || MEL || align=right | 3.6 km || 
|-id=095 bgcolor=#d6d6d6
| 379095 ||  || — || December 6, 2008 || Kitt Peak || Spacewatch || — || align=right | 2.7 km || 
|-id=096 bgcolor=#d6d6d6
| 379096 ||  || — || October 10, 2008 || Mount Lemmon || Mount Lemmon Survey || — || align=right | 3.6 km || 
|-id=097 bgcolor=#d6d6d6
| 379097 ||  || — || December 22, 2008 || Marly || P. Kocher || — || align=right | 2.7 km || 
|-id=098 bgcolor=#d6d6d6
| 379098 ||  || — || December 21, 2008 || Črni Vrh || Črni Vrh || Tj (2.98) || align=right | 4.1 km || 
|-id=099 bgcolor=#fefefe
| 379099 ||  || — || November 20, 2001 || Socorro || LINEAR || — || align=right data-sort-value="0.78" | 780 m || 
|-id=100 bgcolor=#d6d6d6
| 379100 ||  || — || December 20, 2008 || La Sagra || OAM Obs. || — || align=right | 3.4 km || 
|}

379101–379200 

|-bgcolor=#d6d6d6
| 379101 ||  || — || December 21, 2008 || Mount Lemmon || Mount Lemmon Survey || VER || align=right | 3.7 km || 
|-id=102 bgcolor=#d6d6d6
| 379102 ||  || — || November 8, 2008 || Mount Lemmon || Mount Lemmon Survey || EOS || align=right | 2.4 km || 
|-id=103 bgcolor=#d6d6d6
| 379103 ||  || — || December 21, 2008 || Mount Lemmon || Mount Lemmon Survey || EUP || align=right | 7.9 km || 
|-id=104 bgcolor=#d6d6d6
| 379104 ||  || — || November 30, 2008 || Kitt Peak || Spacewatch || — || align=right | 4.0 km || 
|-id=105 bgcolor=#d6d6d6
| 379105 ||  || — || December 21, 2008 || Mount Lemmon || Mount Lemmon Survey || — || align=right | 4.4 km || 
|-id=106 bgcolor=#d6d6d6
| 379106 ||  || — || December 21, 2008 || La Sagra || OAM Obs. || EUP || align=right | 5.0 km || 
|-id=107 bgcolor=#d6d6d6
| 379107 ||  || — || December 22, 2008 || Catalina || CSS || — || align=right | 4.3 km || 
|-id=108 bgcolor=#d6d6d6
| 379108 ||  || — || December 30, 2008 || Mount Lemmon || Mount Lemmon Survey || HYG || align=right | 3.3 km || 
|-id=109 bgcolor=#d6d6d6
| 379109 ||  || — || December 30, 2008 || Catalina || CSS || — || align=right | 4.0 km || 
|-id=110 bgcolor=#d6d6d6
| 379110 ||  || — || December 30, 2008 || Kitt Peak || Spacewatch || — || align=right | 3.4 km || 
|-id=111 bgcolor=#d6d6d6
| 379111 ||  || — || December 30, 2008 || Mount Lemmon || Mount Lemmon Survey || — || align=right | 3.7 km || 
|-id=112 bgcolor=#d6d6d6
| 379112 ||  || — || December 30, 2008 || Mount Lemmon || Mount Lemmon Survey || — || align=right | 4.1 km || 
|-id=113 bgcolor=#d6d6d6
| 379113 ||  || — || December 29, 2008 || Kitt Peak || Spacewatch || HYG || align=right | 3.0 km || 
|-id=114 bgcolor=#d6d6d6
| 379114 ||  || — || December 30, 2008 || Kitt Peak || Spacewatch || 7:4 || align=right | 4.2 km || 
|-id=115 bgcolor=#d6d6d6
| 379115 ||  || — || December 30, 2008 || Kitt Peak || Spacewatch || HYG || align=right | 3.2 km || 
|-id=116 bgcolor=#d6d6d6
| 379116 ||  || — || December 30, 2008 || Kitt Peak || Spacewatch || — || align=right | 2.9 km || 
|-id=117 bgcolor=#d6d6d6
| 379117 ||  || — || December 30, 2008 || Kitt Peak || Spacewatch || — || align=right | 3.9 km || 
|-id=118 bgcolor=#d6d6d6
| 379118 ||  || — || December 30, 2008 || Kitt Peak || Spacewatch || THM || align=right | 2.3 km || 
|-id=119 bgcolor=#d6d6d6
| 379119 ||  || — || December 30, 2008 || Socorro || LINEAR || — || align=right | 3.0 km || 
|-id=120 bgcolor=#d6d6d6
| 379120 ||  || — || January 2, 2009 || Mount Lemmon || Mount Lemmon Survey || — || align=right | 2.4 km || 
|-id=121 bgcolor=#d6d6d6
| 379121 ||  || — || January 3, 2009 || Kitt Peak || Spacewatch || THM || align=right | 2.5 km || 
|-id=122 bgcolor=#d6d6d6
| 379122 ||  || — || January 15, 2009 || Kitt Peak || Spacewatch || — || align=right | 3.5 km || 
|-id=123 bgcolor=#d6d6d6
| 379123 ||  || — || January 1, 2009 || Kitt Peak || Spacewatch || — || align=right | 2.7 km || 
|-id=124 bgcolor=#d6d6d6
| 379124 ||  || — || January 20, 2009 || Bergisch Gladbach || W. Bickel || — || align=right | 2.7 km || 
|-id=125 bgcolor=#d6d6d6
| 379125 ||  || — || January 16, 2009 || Kitt Peak || Spacewatch || — || align=right | 3.4 km || 
|-id=126 bgcolor=#d6d6d6
| 379126 ||  || — || January 16, 2009 || Kitt Peak || Spacewatch || — || align=right | 3.3 km || 
|-id=127 bgcolor=#d6d6d6
| 379127 ||  || — || January 20, 2009 || Catalina || CSS || — || align=right | 4.8 km || 
|-id=128 bgcolor=#d6d6d6
| 379128 ||  || — || November 5, 2007 || Mount Lemmon || Mount Lemmon Survey || 7:4 || align=right | 3.3 km || 
|-id=129 bgcolor=#d6d6d6
| 379129 ||  || — || January 20, 2009 || Catalina || CSS || MEL || align=right | 3.6 km || 
|-id=130 bgcolor=#d6d6d6
| 379130 Lopresti ||  ||  || February 15, 2009 || San Marcello || L. Tesi, G. Fagioli || — || align=right | 3.7 km || 
|-id=131 bgcolor=#d6d6d6
| 379131 ||  || — || February 13, 2009 || Kitt Peak || Spacewatch || HYG || align=right | 3.1 km || 
|-id=132 bgcolor=#E9E9E9
| 379132 ||  || — || February 14, 2009 || Mount Lemmon || Mount Lemmon Survey || DOR || align=right | 3.4 km || 
|-id=133 bgcolor=#d6d6d6
| 379133 ||  || — || February 14, 2009 || Kitt Peak || Spacewatch || — || align=right | 2.5 km || 
|-id=134 bgcolor=#d6d6d6
| 379134 ||  || — || February 13, 2009 || La Sagra || OAM Obs. || — || align=right | 4.8 km || 
|-id=135 bgcolor=#d6d6d6
| 379135 ||  || — || February 14, 2009 || Catalina || CSS || Tj (2.98) || align=right | 4.1 km || 
|-id=136 bgcolor=#d6d6d6
| 379136 ||  || — || February 19, 2009 || Kitt Peak || Spacewatch || 3:2 || align=right | 5.9 km || 
|-id=137 bgcolor=#d6d6d6
| 379137 ||  || — || February 21, 2009 || Mount Lemmon || Mount Lemmon Survey || — || align=right | 3.7 km || 
|-id=138 bgcolor=#fefefe
| 379138 ||  || — || February 20, 2009 || Catalina || CSS || H || align=right data-sort-value="0.61" | 610 m || 
|-id=139 bgcolor=#FA8072
| 379139 ||  || — || February 19, 2009 || Kitt Peak || Spacewatch || — || align=right data-sort-value="0.80" | 800 m || 
|-id=140 bgcolor=#E9E9E9
| 379140 ||  || — || February 19, 2009 || Catalina || CSS || — || align=right data-sort-value="0.79" | 790 m || 
|-id=141 bgcolor=#d6d6d6
| 379141 ||  || — || March 15, 2009 || Kitt Peak || Spacewatch || 3:2 || align=right | 4.5 km || 
|-id=142 bgcolor=#d6d6d6
| 379142 ||  || — || March 17, 2009 || Kitt Peak || Spacewatch || HIL3:2 || align=right | 6.5 km || 
|-id=143 bgcolor=#C2FFFF
| 379143 ||  || — || April 19, 2009 || Kitt Peak || Spacewatch || L5 || align=right | 14 km || 
|-id=144 bgcolor=#fefefe
| 379144 ||  || — || April 17, 2009 || Catalina || CSS || H || align=right data-sort-value="0.70" | 700 m || 
|-id=145 bgcolor=#fefefe
| 379145 ||  || — || April 21, 2009 || Kitt Peak || Spacewatch || — || align=right data-sort-value="0.62" | 620 m || 
|-id=146 bgcolor=#fefefe
| 379146 ||  || — || July 16, 2009 || La Sagra || OAM Obs. || — || align=right data-sort-value="0.88" | 880 m || 
|-id=147 bgcolor=#fefefe
| 379147 ||  || — || July 24, 2009 || Sierra Stars || R. Matson || FLO || align=right data-sort-value="0.55" | 550 m || 
|-id=148 bgcolor=#fefefe
| 379148 ||  || — || August 15, 2009 || Kitt Peak || Spacewatch || — || align=right data-sort-value="0.94" | 940 m || 
|-id=149 bgcolor=#fefefe
| 379149 ||  || — || August 15, 2009 || La Sagra || OAM Obs. || NYS || align=right data-sort-value="0.72" | 720 m || 
|-id=150 bgcolor=#fefefe
| 379150 ||  || — || August 15, 2009 || Catalina || CSS || NYS || align=right data-sort-value="0.77" | 770 m || 
|-id=151 bgcolor=#fefefe
| 379151 ||  || — || August 14, 2009 || Siding Spring || SSS || PHO || align=right | 1.6 km || 
|-id=152 bgcolor=#fefefe
| 379152 ||  || — || August 15, 2009 || Catalina || CSS || — || align=right data-sort-value="0.94" | 940 m || 
|-id=153 bgcolor=#fefefe
| 379153 ||  || — || March 31, 2008 || Mount Lemmon || Mount Lemmon Survey || NYS || align=right data-sort-value="0.65" | 650 m || 
|-id=154 bgcolor=#fefefe
| 379154 ||  || — || August 16, 2009 || La Sagra || OAM Obs. || EUT || align=right data-sort-value="0.69" | 690 m || 
|-id=155 bgcolor=#fefefe
| 379155 Volkerheinrich ||  ||  || August 18, 2009 || Tzec Maun || E. Schwab || — || align=right data-sort-value="0.77" | 770 m || 
|-id=156 bgcolor=#FA8072
| 379156 ||  || — || August 17, 2009 || Socorro || LINEAR || — || align=right | 1.1 km || 
|-id=157 bgcolor=#fefefe
| 379157 ||  || — || August 16, 2009 || Kitt Peak || Spacewatch || — || align=right | 1.1 km || 
|-id=158 bgcolor=#fefefe
| 379158 ||  || — || August 16, 2009 || Kitt Peak || Spacewatch || — || align=right data-sort-value="0.82" | 820 m || 
|-id=159 bgcolor=#fefefe
| 379159 ||  || — || August 16, 2009 || Kitt Peak || Spacewatch || NYS || align=right data-sort-value="0.63" | 630 m || 
|-id=160 bgcolor=#fefefe
| 379160 ||  || — || August 17, 2009 || La Sagra || OAM Obs. || NYS || align=right data-sort-value="0.74" | 740 m || 
|-id=161 bgcolor=#fefefe
| 379161 ||  || — || August 18, 2009 || Kitt Peak || Spacewatch || — || align=right data-sort-value="0.83" | 830 m || 
|-id=162 bgcolor=#fefefe
| 379162 ||  || — || June 16, 2005 || Mount Lemmon || Mount Lemmon Survey || — || align=right data-sort-value="0.77" | 770 m || 
|-id=163 bgcolor=#fefefe
| 379163 ||  || — || August 20, 2009 || La Sagra || OAM Obs. || NYS || align=right data-sort-value="0.68" | 680 m || 
|-id=164 bgcolor=#fefefe
| 379164 ||  || — || August 20, 2009 || Kitt Peak || Spacewatch || NYS || align=right data-sort-value="0.53" | 530 m || 
|-id=165 bgcolor=#fefefe
| 379165 ||  || — || April 6, 2008 || Mount Lemmon || Mount Lemmon Survey || — || align=right data-sort-value="0.89" | 890 m || 
|-id=166 bgcolor=#fefefe
| 379166 ||  || — || August 22, 2009 || Socorro || LINEAR || — || align=right data-sort-value="0.96" | 960 m || 
|-id=167 bgcolor=#fefefe
| 379167 ||  || — || August 16, 2009 || Kitt Peak || Spacewatch || NYS || align=right data-sort-value="0.61" | 610 m || 
|-id=168 bgcolor=#fefefe
| 379168 ||  || — || August 16, 2009 || Kitt Peak || Spacewatch || — || align=right | 1.1 km || 
|-id=169 bgcolor=#fefefe
| 379169 ||  || — || August 16, 2009 || Kitt Peak || Spacewatch || — || align=right | 1.0 km || 
|-id=170 bgcolor=#fefefe
| 379170 ||  || — || August 28, 2009 || Kitt Peak || Spacewatch || — || align=right data-sort-value="0.73" | 730 m || 
|-id=171 bgcolor=#fefefe
| 379171 ||  || — || August 16, 2009 || Kitt Peak || Spacewatch || — || align=right data-sort-value="0.74" | 740 m || 
|-id=172 bgcolor=#fefefe
| 379172 ||  || — || August 16, 2009 || Kitt Peak || Spacewatch || — || align=right data-sort-value="0.97" | 970 m || 
|-id=173 bgcolor=#E9E9E9
| 379173 Gamaovalia ||  ||  || September 10, 2009 || ESA OGS || M. Busch, R. Kresken || — || align=right | 2.1 km || 
|-id=174 bgcolor=#E9E9E9
| 379174 ||  || — || August 28, 2009 || Catalina || CSS || — || align=right | 1.7 km || 
|-id=175 bgcolor=#fefefe
| 379175 ||  || — || September 13, 2009 || Kachina || J. Hobart || — || align=right data-sort-value="0.80" | 800 m || 
|-id=176 bgcolor=#fefefe
| 379176 ||  || — || September 13, 2009 || Dauban || F. Kugel || — || align=right | 1.1 km || 
|-id=177 bgcolor=#fefefe
| 379177 ||  || — || September 12, 2009 || Kitt Peak || Spacewatch || NYS || align=right data-sort-value="0.53" | 530 m || 
|-id=178 bgcolor=#fefefe
| 379178 ||  || — || September 12, 2009 || Kitt Peak || Spacewatch || MAS || align=right data-sort-value="0.83" | 830 m || 
|-id=179 bgcolor=#fefefe
| 379179 ||  || — || September 12, 2009 || Kitt Peak || Spacewatch || — || align=right data-sort-value="0.85" | 850 m || 
|-id=180 bgcolor=#fefefe
| 379180 ||  || — || August 20, 2009 || Kitt Peak || Spacewatch || — || align=right data-sort-value="0.70" | 700 m || 
|-id=181 bgcolor=#fefefe
| 379181 ||  || — || September 14, 2009 || La Sagra || OAM Obs. || NYS || align=right data-sort-value="0.75" | 750 m || 
|-id=182 bgcolor=#fefefe
| 379182 ||  || — || August 16, 2009 || Kitt Peak || Spacewatch || — || align=right data-sort-value="0.74" | 740 m || 
|-id=183 bgcolor=#fefefe
| 379183 ||  || — || September 14, 2009 || Kitt Peak || Spacewatch || — || align=right | 1.1 km || 
|-id=184 bgcolor=#fefefe
| 379184 ||  || — || September 15, 2009 || Kitt Peak || Spacewatch || V || align=right data-sort-value="0.72" | 720 m || 
|-id=185 bgcolor=#E9E9E9
| 379185 ||  || — || September 15, 2009 || Kitt Peak || Spacewatch || — || align=right | 1.9 km || 
|-id=186 bgcolor=#fefefe
| 379186 ||  || — || September 15, 2009 || Kitt Peak || Spacewatch || FLO || align=right data-sort-value="0.67" | 670 m || 
|-id=187 bgcolor=#C2FFFF
| 379187 ||  || — || September 15, 2009 || Kitt Peak || Spacewatch || L4 || align=right | 12 km || 
|-id=188 bgcolor=#fefefe
| 379188 ||  || — || August 17, 2009 || Catalina || CSS || — || align=right | 1.1 km || 
|-id=189 bgcolor=#fefefe
| 379189 ||  || — || September 15, 2009 || Mount Lemmon || Mount Lemmon Survey || — || align=right data-sort-value="0.96" | 960 m || 
|-id=190 bgcolor=#fefefe
| 379190 ||  || — || December 12, 2006 || Mount Lemmon || Mount Lemmon Survey || — || align=right data-sort-value="0.82" | 820 m || 
|-id=191 bgcolor=#fefefe
| 379191 ||  || — || August 26, 2009 || Catalina || CSS || — || align=right data-sort-value="0.91" | 910 m || 
|-id=192 bgcolor=#fefefe
| 379192 ||  || — || September 20, 2009 || Mayhill || A. Lowe || — || align=right data-sort-value="0.93" | 930 m || 
|-id=193 bgcolor=#fefefe
| 379193 ||  || — || August 27, 2009 || Kitt Peak || Spacewatch || — || align=right data-sort-value="0.98" | 980 m || 
|-id=194 bgcolor=#E9E9E9
| 379194 ||  || — || September 16, 2009 || Kitt Peak || Spacewatch || MAR || align=right | 1.1 km || 
|-id=195 bgcolor=#fefefe
| 379195 ||  || — || September 16, 2009 || Kitt Peak || Spacewatch || — || align=right | 1.00 km || 
|-id=196 bgcolor=#fefefe
| 379196 ||  || — || September 16, 2009 || Kitt Peak || Spacewatch || V || align=right data-sort-value="0.80" | 800 m || 
|-id=197 bgcolor=#fefefe
| 379197 ||  || — || September 16, 2009 || Kitt Peak || Spacewatch || V || align=right data-sort-value="0.89" | 890 m || 
|-id=198 bgcolor=#E9E9E9
| 379198 ||  || — || April 22, 2004 || Siding Spring || SSS || EUN || align=right | 1.4 km || 
|-id=199 bgcolor=#fefefe
| 379199 ||  || — || September 17, 2009 || Catalina || CSS || — || align=right | 1.2 km || 
|-id=200 bgcolor=#fefefe
| 379200 ||  || — || September 17, 2009 || Kitt Peak || Spacewatch || — || align=right data-sort-value="0.78" | 780 m || 
|}

379201–379300 

|-bgcolor=#fefefe
| 379201 ||  || — || September 17, 2009 || Kitt Peak || Spacewatch || — || align=right | 1.2 km || 
|-id=202 bgcolor=#fefefe
| 379202 ||  || — || August 16, 2009 || Kitt Peak || Spacewatch || — || align=right data-sort-value="0.84" | 840 m || 
|-id=203 bgcolor=#fefefe
| 379203 ||  || — || September 17, 2009 || Kitt Peak || Spacewatch || NYS || align=right data-sort-value="0.84" | 840 m || 
|-id=204 bgcolor=#E9E9E9
| 379204 ||  || — || March 11, 2007 || Anderson Mesa || LONEOS || — || align=right | 1.2 km || 
|-id=205 bgcolor=#fefefe
| 379205 ||  || — || September 18, 2009 || Kitt Peak || Spacewatch || MAS || align=right data-sort-value="0.77" | 770 m || 
|-id=206 bgcolor=#E9E9E9
| 379206 ||  || — || September 19, 2009 || Mount Lemmon || Mount Lemmon Survey || — || align=right | 1.7 km || 
|-id=207 bgcolor=#fefefe
| 379207 ||  || — || September 24, 2009 || Jarnac || Jarnac Obs. || NYS || align=right data-sort-value="0.73" | 730 m || 
|-id=208 bgcolor=#fefefe
| 379208 ||  || — || September 18, 2009 || Kitt Peak || Spacewatch || — || align=right data-sort-value="0.74" | 740 m || 
|-id=209 bgcolor=#E9E9E9
| 379209 ||  || — || September 18, 2009 || Kitt Peak || Spacewatch || — || align=right | 1.4 km || 
|-id=210 bgcolor=#fefefe
| 379210 ||  || — || September 18, 2009 || Kitt Peak || Spacewatch || — || align=right | 1.1 km || 
|-id=211 bgcolor=#fefefe
| 379211 ||  || — || September 18, 2009 || Kitt Peak || Spacewatch || — || align=right data-sort-value="0.86" | 860 m || 
|-id=212 bgcolor=#fefefe
| 379212 ||  || — || September 18, 2009 || Kitt Peak || Spacewatch || — || align=right data-sort-value="0.80" | 800 m || 
|-id=213 bgcolor=#fefefe
| 379213 ||  || — || September 18, 2009 || Kitt Peak || Spacewatch || V || align=right data-sort-value="0.82" | 820 m || 
|-id=214 bgcolor=#E9E9E9
| 379214 ||  || — || September 18, 2009 || Kitt Peak || Spacewatch || — || align=right data-sort-value="0.90" | 900 m || 
|-id=215 bgcolor=#fefefe
| 379215 ||  || — || September 19, 2009 || Kitt Peak || Spacewatch || NYS || align=right data-sort-value="0.65" | 650 m || 
|-id=216 bgcolor=#fefefe
| 379216 ||  || — || September 20, 2009 || Kitt Peak || Spacewatch || — || align=right data-sort-value="0.74" | 740 m || 
|-id=217 bgcolor=#fefefe
| 379217 ||  || — || September 20, 2009 || Kitt Peak || Spacewatch || — || align=right data-sort-value="0.73" | 730 m || 
|-id=218 bgcolor=#fefefe
| 379218 ||  || — || September 21, 2009 || Mount Lemmon || Mount Lemmon Survey || MAScritical || align=right data-sort-value="0.71" | 710 m || 
|-id=219 bgcolor=#E9E9E9
| 379219 ||  || — || September 21, 2009 || Kitt Peak || Spacewatch || EUN || align=right | 1.5 km || 
|-id=220 bgcolor=#fefefe
| 379220 ||  || — || September 21, 2009 || Kitt Peak || Spacewatch || V || align=right data-sort-value="0.76" | 760 m || 
|-id=221 bgcolor=#fefefe
| 379221 ||  || — || September 22, 2009 || Kitt Peak || Spacewatch || — || align=right data-sort-value="0.82" | 820 m || 
|-id=222 bgcolor=#E9E9E9
| 379222 ||  || — || September 22, 2009 || Kitt Peak || Spacewatch || — || align=right data-sort-value="0.91" | 910 m || 
|-id=223 bgcolor=#E9E9E9
| 379223 ||  || — || September 22, 2009 || Kitt Peak || Spacewatch || ADE || align=right | 1.6 km || 
|-id=224 bgcolor=#fefefe
| 379224 ||  || — || September 23, 2009 || Kitt Peak || Spacewatch || — || align=right data-sort-value="0.75" | 750 m || 
|-id=225 bgcolor=#E9E9E9
| 379225 ||  || — || September 23, 2009 || Kitt Peak || Spacewatch || — || align=right data-sort-value="0.80" | 800 m || 
|-id=226 bgcolor=#fefefe
| 379226 ||  || — || September 24, 2009 || Mount Lemmon || Mount Lemmon Survey || — || align=right data-sort-value="0.81" | 810 m || 
|-id=227 bgcolor=#fefefe
| 379227 ||  || — || September 16, 2009 || Catalina || CSS || — || align=right | 1.2 km || 
|-id=228 bgcolor=#fefefe
| 379228 ||  || — || September 20, 2009 || Kitt Peak || Spacewatch || LCI || align=right | 1.0 km || 
|-id=229 bgcolor=#E9E9E9
| 379229 ||  || — || September 18, 2009 || Catalina || CSS || — || align=right | 2.3 km || 
|-id=230 bgcolor=#E9E9E9
| 379230 ||  || — || September 22, 2009 || Mount Lemmon || Mount Lemmon Survey || — || align=right | 1.9 km || 
|-id=231 bgcolor=#fefefe
| 379231 ||  || — || January 4, 2003 || Kitt Peak || Spacewatch || NYS || align=right data-sort-value="0.73" | 730 m || 
|-id=232 bgcolor=#fefefe
| 379232 ||  || — || September 24, 2009 || Kitt Peak || Spacewatch || MAS || align=right data-sort-value="0.65" | 650 m || 
|-id=233 bgcolor=#fefefe
| 379233 ||  || — || September 17, 2009 || Kitt Peak || Spacewatch || MAS || align=right data-sort-value="0.72" | 720 m || 
|-id=234 bgcolor=#fefefe
| 379234 ||  || — || September 16, 2009 || Kitt Peak || Spacewatch || — || align=right data-sort-value="0.80" | 800 m || 
|-id=235 bgcolor=#fefefe
| 379235 ||  || — || September 25, 2009 || Kitt Peak || Spacewatch || MAS || align=right data-sort-value="0.57" | 570 m || 
|-id=236 bgcolor=#fefefe
| 379236 ||  || — || September 17, 2009 || Kitt Peak || Spacewatch || — || align=right data-sort-value="0.70" | 700 m || 
|-id=237 bgcolor=#fefefe
| 379237 ||  || — || September 25, 2009 || Kitt Peak || Spacewatch || NYS || align=right data-sort-value="0.69" | 690 m || 
|-id=238 bgcolor=#fefefe
| 379238 ||  || — || September 17, 2009 || Kitt Peak || Spacewatch || — || align=right data-sort-value="0.89" | 890 m || 
|-id=239 bgcolor=#E9E9E9
| 379239 ||  || — || September 22, 2009 || Mount Lemmon || Mount Lemmon Survey || — || align=right data-sort-value="0.89" | 890 m || 
|-id=240 bgcolor=#E9E9E9
| 379240 ||  || — || September 20, 2009 || Mount Lemmon || Mount Lemmon Survey || — || align=right | 1.3 km || 
|-id=241 bgcolor=#E9E9E9
| 379241 ||  || — || September 28, 2009 || Catalina || CSS || — || align=right | 1.4 km || 
|-id=242 bgcolor=#fefefe
| 379242 ||  || — || September 16, 2009 || Kitt Peak || Spacewatch || — || align=right data-sort-value="0.50" | 500 m || 
|-id=243 bgcolor=#E9E9E9
| 379243 ||  || — || April 15, 2007 || Catalina || CSS || HNS || align=right | 1.5 km || 
|-id=244 bgcolor=#E9E9E9
| 379244 ||  || — || September 22, 2009 || Mount Lemmon || Mount Lemmon Survey || GEF || align=right | 1.5 km || 
|-id=245 bgcolor=#E9E9E9
| 379245 ||  || — || September 22, 2009 || Mount Lemmon || Mount Lemmon Survey || — || align=right data-sort-value="0.86" | 860 m || 
|-id=246 bgcolor=#E9E9E9
| 379246 ||  || — || September 20, 2009 || Mount Lemmon || Mount Lemmon Survey || — || align=right | 1.8 km || 
|-id=247 bgcolor=#E9E9E9
| 379247 ||  || — || October 11, 2009 || Mount Lemmon || Mount Lemmon Survey || — || align=right | 1.2 km || 
|-id=248 bgcolor=#fefefe
| 379248 ||  || — || October 15, 2009 || Taunus || S. Karge, R. Kling || — || align=right | 1.0 km || 
|-id=249 bgcolor=#E9E9E9
| 379249 ||  || — || October 15, 2009 || Catalina || CSS || EUN || align=right | 1.4 km || 
|-id=250 bgcolor=#fefefe
| 379250 ||  || — || September 18, 2009 || Kitt Peak || Spacewatch || — || align=right data-sort-value="0.79" | 790 m || 
|-id=251 bgcolor=#E9E9E9
| 379251 ||  || — || October 11, 2009 || Mount Lemmon || Mount Lemmon Survey || — || align=right data-sort-value="0.82" | 820 m || 
|-id=252 bgcolor=#fefefe
| 379252 ||  || — || October 14, 2009 || Catalina || CSS || — || align=right data-sort-value="0.84" | 840 m || 
|-id=253 bgcolor=#E9E9E9
| 379253 ||  || — || September 28, 2009 || Mount Lemmon || Mount Lemmon Survey || GER || align=right | 3.1 km || 
|-id=254 bgcolor=#E9E9E9
| 379254 ||  || — || October 14, 2009 || Catalina || CSS || — || align=right | 2.0 km || 
|-id=255 bgcolor=#E9E9E9
| 379255 ||  || — || October 2, 2009 || Mount Lemmon || Mount Lemmon Survey || — || align=right | 1.2 km || 
|-id=256 bgcolor=#fefefe
| 379256 ||  || — || August 31, 2005 || Campo Imperatore || CINEOS || V || align=right data-sort-value="0.58" | 580 m || 
|-id=257 bgcolor=#fefefe
| 379257 ||  || — || October 16, 2009 || Dauban || F. Kugel || V || align=right data-sort-value="0.91" | 910 m || 
|-id=258 bgcolor=#fefefe
| 379258 ||  || — || October 17, 2009 || La Sagra || OAM Obs. || — || align=right data-sort-value="0.57" | 570 m || 
|-id=259 bgcolor=#E9E9E9
| 379259 ||  || — || October 23, 2009 || BlackBird || K. Levin || — || align=right | 1.8 km || 
|-id=260 bgcolor=#fefefe
| 379260 ||  || — || October 18, 2009 || Mount Lemmon || Mount Lemmon Survey || — || align=right data-sort-value="0.96" | 960 m || 
|-id=261 bgcolor=#E9E9E9
| 379261 ||  || — || October 18, 2009 || Mount Lemmon || Mount Lemmon Survey || — || align=right | 1.5 km || 
|-id=262 bgcolor=#E9E9E9
| 379262 ||  || — || October 18, 2009 || Mount Lemmon || Mount Lemmon Survey || RAF || align=right | 1.3 km || 
|-id=263 bgcolor=#E9E9E9
| 379263 ||  || — || January 25, 2007 || Kitt Peak || Spacewatch || — || align=right | 1.0 km || 
|-id=264 bgcolor=#E9E9E9
| 379264 ||  || — || October 19, 2009 || Kitt Peak || Spacewatch || — || align=right | 2.0 km || 
|-id=265 bgcolor=#fefefe
| 379265 ||  || — || October 22, 2009 || Mount Lemmon || Mount Lemmon Survey || NYS || align=right data-sort-value="0.69" | 690 m || 
|-id=266 bgcolor=#E9E9E9
| 379266 ||  || — || October 22, 2009 || Catalina || CSS || — || align=right | 1.8 km || 
|-id=267 bgcolor=#fefefe
| 379267 ||  || — || October 17, 2009 || Mount Lemmon || Mount Lemmon Survey || NYS || align=right data-sort-value="0.61" | 610 m || 
|-id=268 bgcolor=#E9E9E9
| 379268 ||  || — || October 22, 2009 || Catalina || CSS || — || align=right data-sort-value="0.80" | 800 m || 
|-id=269 bgcolor=#E9E9E9
| 379269 ||  || — || September 30, 2005 || Mount Lemmon || Mount Lemmon Survey || MAR || align=right | 1.2 km || 
|-id=270 bgcolor=#E9E9E9
| 379270 ||  || — || October 24, 2009 || Catalina || CSS || — || align=right | 1.0 km || 
|-id=271 bgcolor=#E9E9E9
| 379271 ||  || — || October 23, 2009 || Mount Lemmon || Mount Lemmon Survey || — || align=right data-sort-value="0.96" | 960 m || 
|-id=272 bgcolor=#E9E9E9
| 379272 ||  || — || October 23, 2009 || Mount Lemmon || Mount Lemmon Survey || — || align=right data-sort-value="0.98" | 980 m || 
|-id=273 bgcolor=#fefefe
| 379273 ||  || — || October 23, 2009 || Mount Lemmon || Mount Lemmon Survey || V || align=right data-sort-value="0.68" | 680 m || 
|-id=274 bgcolor=#E9E9E9
| 379274 ||  || — || November 4, 2005 || Mount Lemmon || Mount Lemmon Survey || — || align=right data-sort-value="0.84" | 840 m || 
|-id=275 bgcolor=#E9E9E9
| 379275 ||  || — || October 24, 2009 || Catalina || CSS || — || align=right | 1.0 km || 
|-id=276 bgcolor=#fefefe
| 379276 ||  || — || October 21, 2009 || Mount Lemmon || Mount Lemmon Survey || MAS || align=right data-sort-value="0.71" | 710 m || 
|-id=277 bgcolor=#E9E9E9
| 379277 ||  || — || October 22, 2009 || Catalina || CSS || GER || align=right | 2.1 km || 
|-id=278 bgcolor=#E9E9E9
| 379278 ||  || — || October 27, 2009 || Mount Lemmon || Mount Lemmon Survey || — || align=right | 3.5 km || 
|-id=279 bgcolor=#E9E9E9
| 379279 ||  || — || October 22, 2009 || Mount Lemmon || Mount Lemmon Survey || — || align=right | 1.3 km || 
|-id=280 bgcolor=#E9E9E9
| 379280 ||  || — || October 16, 2009 || Mount Lemmon || Mount Lemmon Survey || — || align=right | 1.9 km || 
|-id=281 bgcolor=#E9E9E9
| 379281 ||  || — || October 24, 2009 || Kitt Peak || Spacewatch || EUN || align=right | 1.2 km || 
|-id=282 bgcolor=#E9E9E9
| 379282 ||  || — || October 30, 2009 || Mount Lemmon || Mount Lemmon Survey || — || align=right | 1.2 km || 
|-id=283 bgcolor=#E9E9E9
| 379283 ||  || — || November 9, 2009 || Tzec Maun || D. Chestnov, A. Novichonok || — || align=right | 3.4 km || 
|-id=284 bgcolor=#E9E9E9
| 379284 ||  || — || February 21, 2007 || Mount Lemmon || Mount Lemmon Survey || — || align=right | 2.2 km || 
|-id=285 bgcolor=#E9E9E9
| 379285 ||  || — || September 21, 2009 || Mount Lemmon || Mount Lemmon Survey || — || align=right | 1.5 km || 
|-id=286 bgcolor=#E9E9E9
| 379286 ||  || — || September 19, 2009 || Mount Lemmon || Mount Lemmon Survey || — || align=right data-sort-value="0.85" | 850 m || 
|-id=287 bgcolor=#E9E9E9
| 379287 ||  || — || November 8, 2009 || Mount Lemmon || Mount Lemmon Survey || — || align=right | 2.3 km || 
|-id=288 bgcolor=#E9E9E9
| 379288 ||  || — || November 8, 2009 || Kitt Peak || Spacewatch || MAR || align=right | 1.1 km || 
|-id=289 bgcolor=#E9E9E9
| 379289 ||  || — || November 9, 2009 || Mount Lemmon || Mount Lemmon Survey || ADE || align=right | 2.8 km || 
|-id=290 bgcolor=#E9E9E9
| 379290 ||  || — || October 25, 2009 || Kitt Peak || Spacewatch || — || align=right | 1.2 km || 
|-id=291 bgcolor=#E9E9E9
| 379291 ||  || — || October 24, 2009 || Kitt Peak || Spacewatch || — || align=right | 1.8 km || 
|-id=292 bgcolor=#E9E9E9
| 379292 ||  || — || September 22, 1996 || Xinglong || SCAP || — || align=right | 1.3 km || 
|-id=293 bgcolor=#E9E9E9
| 379293 ||  || — || November 12, 2009 || Hibiscus || N. Teamo || — || align=right data-sort-value="0.80" | 800 m || 
|-id=294 bgcolor=#E9E9E9
| 379294 ||  || — || November 15, 2009 || Mayhill || iTelescope Obs. || ADE || align=right | 3.9 km || 
|-id=295 bgcolor=#E9E9E9
| 379295 ||  || — || October 23, 2009 || Kitt Peak || Spacewatch || — || align=right | 1.0 km || 
|-id=296 bgcolor=#E9E9E9
| 379296 ||  || — || November 8, 2009 || Kitt Peak || Spacewatch || — || align=right | 1.8 km || 
|-id=297 bgcolor=#E9E9E9
| 379297 ||  || — || July 1, 2008 || Catalina || CSS || — || align=right | 3.5 km || 
|-id=298 bgcolor=#E9E9E9
| 379298 ||  || — || November 9, 2009 || Mount Lemmon || Mount Lemmon Survey || HEN || align=right data-sort-value="0.86" | 860 m || 
|-id=299 bgcolor=#E9E9E9
| 379299 ||  || — || November 9, 2009 || Mount Lemmon || Mount Lemmon Survey || — || align=right | 2.0 km || 
|-id=300 bgcolor=#E9E9E9
| 379300 ||  || — || November 9, 2009 || Nogales || Tenagra II Obs. || RAF || align=right | 1.1 km || 
|}

379301–379400 

|-bgcolor=#E9E9E9
| 379301 ||  || — || November 14, 2009 || Socorro || LINEAR || — || align=right | 1.0 km || 
|-id=302 bgcolor=#E9E9E9
| 379302 ||  || — || November 13, 2009 || La Sagra || OAM Obs. || — || align=right | 2.2 km || 
|-id=303 bgcolor=#E9E9E9
| 379303 ||  || — || November 9, 2009 || Catalina || CSS || MAR || align=right | 1.5 km || 
|-id=304 bgcolor=#E9E9E9
| 379304 ||  || — || November 9, 2009 || Mount Lemmon || Mount Lemmon Survey || — || align=right | 1.1 km || 
|-id=305 bgcolor=#E9E9E9
| 379305 ||  || — || October 30, 2009 || Mount Lemmon || Mount Lemmon Survey || — || align=right | 1.0 km || 
|-id=306 bgcolor=#E9E9E9
| 379306 ||  || — || November 9, 2009 || Kitt Peak || Spacewatch || — || align=right | 1.2 km || 
|-id=307 bgcolor=#E9E9E9
| 379307 ||  || — || November 10, 2009 || Kitt Peak || Spacewatch || — || align=right data-sort-value="0.84" | 840 m || 
|-id=308 bgcolor=#E9E9E9
| 379308 ||  || — || March 26, 2007 || Kitt Peak || Spacewatch || WIT || align=right | 1.0 km || 
|-id=309 bgcolor=#E9E9E9
| 379309 ||  || — || November 11, 2009 || Kitt Peak || Spacewatch || — || align=right data-sort-value="0.85" | 850 m || 
|-id=310 bgcolor=#E9E9E9
| 379310 ||  || — || November 10, 2009 || Kitt Peak || Spacewatch || EUN || align=right | 1.7 km || 
|-id=311 bgcolor=#E9E9E9
| 379311 ||  || — || December 18, 2004 || Mount Lemmon || Mount Lemmon Survey || — || align=right | 2.6 km || 
|-id=312 bgcolor=#E9E9E9
| 379312 ||  || — || November 16, 2009 || Kitt Peak || Spacewatch || — || align=right | 1.9 km || 
|-id=313 bgcolor=#E9E9E9
| 379313 ||  || — || November 19, 2009 || Socorro || LINEAR || — || align=right | 1.2 km || 
|-id=314 bgcolor=#E9E9E9
| 379314 ||  || — || November 16, 2009 || Mount Lemmon || Mount Lemmon Survey || — || align=right data-sort-value="0.81" | 810 m || 
|-id=315 bgcolor=#E9E9E9
| 379315 ||  || — || October 22, 2009 || Mount Lemmon || Mount Lemmon Survey || — || align=right data-sort-value="0.99" | 990 m || 
|-id=316 bgcolor=#d6d6d6
| 379316 ||  || — || January 28, 2006 || Catalina || CSS || — || align=right | 3.7 km || 
|-id=317 bgcolor=#FA8072
| 379317 ||  || — || November 22, 2009 || Catalina || CSS || — || align=right | 1.4 km || 
|-id=318 bgcolor=#E9E9E9
| 379318 ||  || — || November 25, 2005 || Mount Lemmon || Mount Lemmon Survey || — || align=right data-sort-value="0.81" | 810 m || 
|-id=319 bgcolor=#E9E9E9
| 379319 ||  || — || March 13, 2007 || Mount Lemmon || Mount Lemmon Survey || — || align=right | 1.6 km || 
|-id=320 bgcolor=#E9E9E9
| 379320 ||  || — || November 16, 2009 || Kitt Peak || Spacewatch || — || align=right | 2.0 km || 
|-id=321 bgcolor=#E9E9E9
| 379321 ||  || — || November 16, 2009 || Kitt Peak || Spacewatch || — || align=right | 2.1 km || 
|-id=322 bgcolor=#E9E9E9
| 379322 ||  || — || November 17, 2009 || Kitt Peak || Spacewatch || — || align=right | 1.2 km || 
|-id=323 bgcolor=#E9E9E9
| 379323 ||  || — || December 17, 2001 || Socorro || LINEAR || — || align=right | 1.4 km || 
|-id=324 bgcolor=#E9E9E9
| 379324 ||  || — || November 17, 2009 || Kitt Peak || Spacewatch || — || align=right | 1.2 km || 
|-id=325 bgcolor=#E9E9E9
| 379325 ||  || — || November 17, 2009 || Mount Lemmon || Mount Lemmon Survey || WIT || align=right | 1.3 km || 
|-id=326 bgcolor=#E9E9E9
| 379326 ||  || — || November 17, 2009 || Catalina || CSS || — || align=right | 2.2 km || 
|-id=327 bgcolor=#E9E9E9
| 379327 ||  || — || November 17, 2009 || Mount Lemmon || Mount Lemmon Survey || DOR || align=right | 3.2 km || 
|-id=328 bgcolor=#E9E9E9
| 379328 ||  || — || November 17, 2009 || Kitt Peak || Spacewatch || — || align=right | 1.8 km || 
|-id=329 bgcolor=#E9E9E9
| 379329 ||  || — || November 18, 2009 || Kitt Peak || Spacewatch || — || align=right data-sort-value="0.80" | 800 m || 
|-id=330 bgcolor=#E9E9E9
| 379330 ||  || — || October 21, 2009 || Mount Lemmon || Mount Lemmon Survey || — || align=right | 2.7 km || 
|-id=331 bgcolor=#E9E9E9
| 379331 ||  || — || November 18, 2009 || Kitt Peak || Spacewatch || — || align=right | 1.0 km || 
|-id=332 bgcolor=#fefefe
| 379332 ||  || — || November 18, 2009 || Kitt Peak || Spacewatch || NYS || align=right data-sort-value="0.82" | 820 m || 
|-id=333 bgcolor=#fefefe
| 379333 ||  || — || November 18, 2009 || Kitt Peak || Spacewatch || — || align=right data-sort-value="0.93" | 930 m || 
|-id=334 bgcolor=#E9E9E9
| 379334 ||  || — || November 18, 2009 || Kitt Peak || Spacewatch || — || align=right | 1.0 km || 
|-id=335 bgcolor=#E9E9E9
| 379335 ||  || — || December 25, 2005 || Kitt Peak || Spacewatch || — || align=right | 1.4 km || 
|-id=336 bgcolor=#E9E9E9
| 379336 ||  || — || November 18, 2009 || Kitt Peak || Spacewatch || — || align=right | 1.6 km || 
|-id=337 bgcolor=#E9E9E9
| 379337 ||  || — || November 19, 2009 || Kitt Peak || Spacewatch || — || align=right | 1.7 km || 
|-id=338 bgcolor=#E9E9E9
| 379338 ||  || — || September 19, 2009 || Mount Lemmon || Mount Lemmon Survey || GER || align=right | 1.3 km || 
|-id=339 bgcolor=#E9E9E9
| 379339 ||  || — || November 19, 2009 || Kitt Peak || Spacewatch || — || align=right | 2.7 km || 
|-id=340 bgcolor=#E9E9E9
| 379340 ||  || — || November 19, 2009 || Kitt Peak || Spacewatch || — || align=right | 1.5 km || 
|-id=341 bgcolor=#d6d6d6
| 379341 ||  || — || November 19, 2009 || Kitt Peak || Spacewatch || — || align=right | 4.0 km || 
|-id=342 bgcolor=#E9E9E9
| 379342 ||  || — || November 19, 2009 || Mount Lemmon || Mount Lemmon Survey || — || align=right | 1.5 km || 
|-id=343 bgcolor=#E9E9E9
| 379343 ||  || — || November 19, 2009 || Kitt Peak || Spacewatch || — || align=right | 1.1 km || 
|-id=344 bgcolor=#E9E9E9
| 379344 ||  || — || November 19, 2009 || Kitt Peak || Spacewatch || MAR || align=right | 1.4 km || 
|-id=345 bgcolor=#E9E9E9
| 379345 ||  || — || November 22, 2009 || Kitt Peak || Spacewatch || — || align=right | 1.3 km || 
|-id=346 bgcolor=#E9E9E9
| 379346 ||  || — || November 22, 2009 || Catalina || CSS || — || align=right | 2.0 km || 
|-id=347 bgcolor=#E9E9E9
| 379347 ||  || — || November 25, 2009 || La Sagra || OAM Obs. || — || align=right | 2.2 km || 
|-id=348 bgcolor=#E9E9E9
| 379348 ||  || — || December 1, 2005 || Mount Lemmon || Mount Lemmon Survey || — || align=right | 1.7 km || 
|-id=349 bgcolor=#E9E9E9
| 379349 ||  || — || November 16, 2009 || Kitt Peak || Spacewatch || — || align=right | 1.9 km || 
|-id=350 bgcolor=#E9E9E9
| 379350 ||  || — || November 20, 2009 || Andrushivka || Andrushivka Obs. || — || align=right | 2.1 km || 
|-id=351 bgcolor=#E9E9E9
| 379351 ||  || — || November 21, 2009 || Catalina || CSS || — || align=right | 1.6 km || 
|-id=352 bgcolor=#E9E9E9
| 379352 ||  || — || November 23, 2009 || Catalina || CSS || — || align=right | 1.3 km || 
|-id=353 bgcolor=#E9E9E9
| 379353 ||  || — || March 26, 2007 || Mount Lemmon || Mount Lemmon Survey || KON || align=right | 2.5 km || 
|-id=354 bgcolor=#E9E9E9
| 379354 ||  || — || November 20, 2009 || Mount Lemmon || Mount Lemmon Survey || RAF || align=right | 1.0 km || 
|-id=355 bgcolor=#E9E9E9
| 379355 ||  || — || November 20, 2009 || Andrushivka || Andrushivka Obs. || — || align=right | 1.1 km || 
|-id=356 bgcolor=#E9E9E9
| 379356 ||  || — || November 21, 2009 || Kitt Peak || Spacewatch || — || align=right | 1.1 km || 
|-id=357 bgcolor=#E9E9E9
| 379357 ||  || — || November 22, 2009 || Mount Lemmon || Mount Lemmon Survey || — || align=right | 1.5 km || 
|-id=358 bgcolor=#E9E9E9
| 379358 ||  || — || November 23, 2009 || Kitt Peak || Spacewatch || — || align=right | 1.7 km || 
|-id=359 bgcolor=#E9E9E9
| 379359 ||  || — || November 23, 2009 || Catalina || CSS || — || align=right | 2.4 km || 
|-id=360 bgcolor=#E9E9E9
| 379360 ||  || — || November 23, 2009 || Kitt Peak || Spacewatch || — || align=right | 1.5 km || 
|-id=361 bgcolor=#E9E9E9
| 379361 ||  || — || November 23, 2009 || Kitt Peak || Spacewatch || — || align=right | 1.5 km || 
|-id=362 bgcolor=#E9E9E9
| 379362 ||  || — || October 28, 2005 || Kitt Peak || Spacewatch || — || align=right | 1.9 km || 
|-id=363 bgcolor=#E9E9E9
| 379363 ||  || — || November 24, 2009 || Mount Lemmon || Mount Lemmon Survey || — || align=right | 1.2 km || 
|-id=364 bgcolor=#E9E9E9
| 379364 ||  || — || November 17, 2009 || Kitt Peak || Spacewatch || — || align=right | 1.2 km || 
|-id=365 bgcolor=#E9E9E9
| 379365 ||  || — || November 18, 2009 || Kitt Peak || Spacewatch || — || align=right | 1.0 km || 
|-id=366 bgcolor=#E9E9E9
| 379366 ||  || — || November 18, 2009 || Kitt Peak || Spacewatch || — || align=right | 1.5 km || 
|-id=367 bgcolor=#E9E9E9
| 379367 ||  || — || November 18, 2009 || Kitt Peak || Spacewatch || — || align=right | 1.4 km || 
|-id=368 bgcolor=#E9E9E9
| 379368 ||  || — || November 21, 2009 || Kitt Peak || Spacewatch || — || align=right | 1.2 km || 
|-id=369 bgcolor=#E9E9E9
| 379369 ||  || — || October 24, 2009 || Catalina || CSS || KON || align=right | 3.9 km || 
|-id=370 bgcolor=#E9E9E9
| 379370 ||  || — || November 19, 2009 || Kitt Peak || Spacewatch || MIS || align=right | 2.9 km || 
|-id=371 bgcolor=#E9E9E9
| 379371 ||  || — || November 16, 2009 || Mount Lemmon || Mount Lemmon Survey || — || align=right data-sort-value="0.85" | 850 m || 
|-id=372 bgcolor=#E9E9E9
| 379372 ||  || — || November 25, 2009 || Kitt Peak || Spacewatch || — || align=right | 2.0 km || 
|-id=373 bgcolor=#E9E9E9
| 379373 ||  || — || November 17, 2009 || Kitt Peak || Spacewatch || — || align=right data-sort-value="0.87" | 870 m || 
|-id=374 bgcolor=#E9E9E9
| 379374 ||  || — || November 20, 2009 || Kitt Peak || Spacewatch || JUN || align=right | 1.1 km || 
|-id=375 bgcolor=#E9E9E9
| 379375 ||  || — || November 16, 2009 || Kitt Peak || Spacewatch || — || align=right | 2.5 km || 
|-id=376 bgcolor=#E9E9E9
| 379376 ||  || — || November 16, 2009 || Socorro || LINEAR || — || align=right | 3.3 km || 
|-id=377 bgcolor=#E9E9E9
| 379377 ||  || — || November 17, 2009 || Socorro || LINEAR || — || align=right | 2.2 km || 
|-id=378 bgcolor=#E9E9E9
| 379378 ||  || — || November 21, 2009 || Mount Lemmon || Mount Lemmon Survey || — || align=right | 1.3 km || 
|-id=379 bgcolor=#E9E9E9
| 379379 ||  || — || December 9, 2009 || La Sagra || OAM Obs. || — || align=right | 2.3 km || 
|-id=380 bgcolor=#E9E9E9
| 379380 ||  || — || December 10, 2009 || Mount Lemmon || Mount Lemmon Survey || — || align=right | 2.2 km || 
|-id=381 bgcolor=#E9E9E9
| 379381 ||  || — || December 10, 2009 || Mount Lemmon || Mount Lemmon Survey || — || align=right | 2.8 km || 
|-id=382 bgcolor=#E9E9E9
| 379382 ||  || — || November 8, 2009 || Kitt Peak || Spacewatch || — || align=right data-sort-value="0.92" | 920 m || 
|-id=383 bgcolor=#E9E9E9
| 379383 ||  || — || November 10, 2009 || Kitt Peak || Spacewatch || NEM || align=right | 2.0 km || 
|-id=384 bgcolor=#E9E9E9
| 379384 ||  || — || December 15, 2009 || Mount Lemmon || Mount Lemmon Survey || WIT || align=right data-sort-value="0.93" | 930 m || 
|-id=385 bgcolor=#E9E9E9
| 379385 ||  || — || December 15, 2009 || Mount Lemmon || Mount Lemmon Survey || — || align=right | 2.5 km || 
|-id=386 bgcolor=#d6d6d6
| 379386 ||  || — || December 15, 2009 || Mount Lemmon || Mount Lemmon Survey || — || align=right | 1.9 km || 
|-id=387 bgcolor=#E9E9E9
| 379387 ||  || — || December 17, 2009 || Mount Lemmon || Mount Lemmon Survey || HEN || align=right | 1.3 km || 
|-id=388 bgcolor=#E9E9E9
| 379388 ||  || — || December 17, 2009 || Mount Lemmon || Mount Lemmon Survey || — || align=right | 1.9 km || 
|-id=389 bgcolor=#E9E9E9
| 379389 ||  || — || December 17, 2009 || Kitt Peak || Spacewatch || AEO || align=right | 1.9 km || 
|-id=390 bgcolor=#E9E9E9
| 379390 ||  || — || December 17, 2009 || Kitt Peak || Spacewatch || — || align=right | 1.0 km || 
|-id=391 bgcolor=#E9E9E9
| 379391 ||  || — || December 17, 2009 || Mount Lemmon || Mount Lemmon Survey || — || align=right | 2.3 km || 
|-id=392 bgcolor=#E9E9E9
| 379392 ||  || — || December 17, 2009 || Mount Lemmon || Mount Lemmon Survey || HOF || align=right | 3.4 km || 
|-id=393 bgcolor=#E9E9E9
| 379393 ||  || — || December 18, 2009 || Mount Lemmon || Mount Lemmon Survey || DOR || align=right | 2.5 km || 
|-id=394 bgcolor=#E9E9E9
| 379394 ||  || — || December 18, 2009 || Kitt Peak || Spacewatch || — || align=right | 3.3 km || 
|-id=395 bgcolor=#E9E9E9
| 379395 ||  || — || September 4, 2008 || Kitt Peak || Spacewatch || AGN || align=right | 1.0 km || 
|-id=396 bgcolor=#E9E9E9
| 379396 ||  || — || December 27, 2009 || Kitt Peak || Spacewatch || — || align=right | 2.7 km || 
|-id=397 bgcolor=#E9E9E9
| 379397 ||  || — || December 27, 2009 || Kitt Peak || Spacewatch || — || align=right | 2.6 km || 
|-id=398 bgcolor=#E9E9E9
| 379398 ||  || — || January 7, 2010 || Bisei SG Center || BATTeRS || — || align=right | 2.3 km || 
|-id=399 bgcolor=#E9E9E9
| 379399 ||  || — || January 9, 2010 || Janesville || Greiner Obs. || ADE || align=right | 2.8 km || 
|-id=400 bgcolor=#E9E9E9
| 379400 ||  || — || January 6, 2010 || Catalina || CSS || — || align=right | 2.9 km || 
|}

379401–379500 

|-bgcolor=#E9E9E9
| 379401 ||  || — || January 6, 2010 || Catalina || CSS || — || align=right | 2.6 km || 
|-id=402 bgcolor=#d6d6d6
| 379402 ||  || — || January 6, 2010 || Catalina || CSS || NAE || align=right | 3.2 km || 
|-id=403 bgcolor=#E9E9E9
| 379403 ||  || — || January 6, 2010 || Catalina || CSS || — || align=right | 2.2 km || 
|-id=404 bgcolor=#d6d6d6
| 379404 ||  || — || January 6, 2010 || Kitt Peak || Spacewatch || — || align=right | 3.9 km || 
|-id=405 bgcolor=#d6d6d6
| 379405 ||  || — || November 17, 2009 || Mount Lemmon || Mount Lemmon Survey || — || align=right | 3.2 km || 
|-id=406 bgcolor=#E9E9E9
| 379406 ||  || — || January 5, 2010 || Kitt Peak || Spacewatch || — || align=right | 2.4 km || 
|-id=407 bgcolor=#d6d6d6
| 379407 ||  || — || January 6, 2010 || Catalina || CSS || — || align=right | 1.8 km || 
|-id=408 bgcolor=#E9E9E9
| 379408 ||  || — || January 6, 2010 || Catalina || CSS || — || align=right | 1.5 km || 
|-id=409 bgcolor=#E9E9E9
| 379409 ||  || — || December 19, 2009 || Kitt Peak || Spacewatch || — || align=right | 2.6 km || 
|-id=410 bgcolor=#d6d6d6
| 379410 ||  || — || January 8, 2010 || Kitt Peak || Spacewatch || LAU || align=right | 3.5 km || 
|-id=411 bgcolor=#E9E9E9
| 379411 ||  || — || December 10, 2009 || Socorro || LINEAR || — || align=right | 1.7 km || 
|-id=412 bgcolor=#E9E9E9
| 379412 ||  || — || January 6, 2010 || Catalina || CSS || — || align=right | 1.8 km || 
|-id=413 bgcolor=#E9E9E9
| 379413 ||  || — || January 10, 2010 || Socorro || LINEAR || DOR || align=right | 3.4 km || 
|-id=414 bgcolor=#E9E9E9
| 379414 ||  || — || January 12, 2010 || Kitt Peak || Spacewatch || HOF || align=right | 3.6 km || 
|-id=415 bgcolor=#E9E9E9
| 379415 ||  || — || January 12, 2010 || Mount Lemmon || Mount Lemmon Survey || — || align=right | 1.3 km || 
|-id=416 bgcolor=#E9E9E9
| 379416 ||  || — || November 27, 2009 || Kitt Peak || Spacewatch || — || align=right | 2.8 km || 
|-id=417 bgcolor=#d6d6d6
| 379417 ||  || — || January 15, 2010 || Catalina || CSS || URS || align=right | 4.4 km || 
|-id=418 bgcolor=#d6d6d6
| 379418 ||  || — || January 7, 2010 || Kitt Peak || Spacewatch || — || align=right | 3.2 km || 
|-id=419 bgcolor=#E9E9E9
| 379419 ||  || — || December 30, 2000 || Socorro || LINEAR || GEF || align=right | 1.5 km || 
|-id=420 bgcolor=#E9E9E9
| 379420 ||  || — || January 10, 2010 || Socorro || LINEAR || — || align=right | 3.4 km || 
|-id=421 bgcolor=#E9E9E9
| 379421 ||  || — || November 16, 2009 || Mount Lemmon || Mount Lemmon Survey || — || align=right | 2.8 km || 
|-id=422 bgcolor=#E9E9E9
| 379422 ||  || — || January 6, 2010 || Catalina || CSS || — || align=right | 2.9 km || 
|-id=423 bgcolor=#d6d6d6
| 379423 ||  || — || January 14, 2010 || WISE || WISE || — || align=right | 3.1 km || 
|-id=424 bgcolor=#E9E9E9
| 379424 ||  || — || January 17, 2010 || Bisei SG Center || BATTeRS || HOF || align=right | 2.6 km || 
|-id=425 bgcolor=#d6d6d6
| 379425 ||  || — || January 17, 2010 || Siding Spring || SSS || EUP || align=right | 6.0 km || 
|-id=426 bgcolor=#d6d6d6
| 379426 ||  || — || January 16, 2010 || WISE || WISE || 7:4 || align=right | 6.5 km || 
|-id=427 bgcolor=#d6d6d6
| 379427 ||  || — || January 27, 2010 || WISE || WISE || EUP || align=right | 4.8 km || 
|-id=428 bgcolor=#E9E9E9
| 379428 ||  || — || February 9, 2010 || Catalina || CSS || AGN || align=right | 1.5 km || 
|-id=429 bgcolor=#d6d6d6
| 379429 ||  || — || December 6, 2008 || Mount Lemmon || Mount Lemmon Survey || — || align=right | 3.5 km || 
|-id=430 bgcolor=#d6d6d6
| 379430 ||  || — || February 12, 2010 || Pla D'Arguines || R. Ferrando || — || align=right | 3.3 km || 
|-id=431 bgcolor=#d6d6d6
| 379431 ||  || — || February 9, 2010 || Mount Lemmon || Mount Lemmon Survey || — || align=right | 3.6 km || 
|-id=432 bgcolor=#d6d6d6
| 379432 ||  || — || April 2, 2006 || Kitt Peak || Spacewatch || KOR || align=right | 1.3 km || 
|-id=433 bgcolor=#d6d6d6
| 379433 ||  || — || October 26, 2008 || Mount Lemmon || Mount Lemmon Survey || — || align=right | 3.7 km || 
|-id=434 bgcolor=#d6d6d6
| 379434 ||  || — || February 10, 2010 || Kitt Peak || Spacewatch || CRO || align=right | 4.4 km || 
|-id=435 bgcolor=#d6d6d6
| 379435 ||  || — || February 6, 2010 || Mount Lemmon || Mount Lemmon Survey || URS || align=right | 5.6 km || 
|-id=436 bgcolor=#d6d6d6
| 379436 ||  || — || January 16, 2010 || Catalina || CSS || — || align=right | 3.6 km || 
|-id=437 bgcolor=#E9E9E9
| 379437 ||  || — || February 14, 2010 || WISE || WISE || — || align=right | 2.6 km || 
|-id=438 bgcolor=#d6d6d6
| 379438 ||  || — || April 12, 2005 || Kitt Peak || Spacewatch || THM || align=right | 3.8 km || 
|-id=439 bgcolor=#E9E9E9
| 379439 ||  || — || February 9, 2010 || Catalina || CSS || — || align=right | 1.5 km || 
|-id=440 bgcolor=#d6d6d6
| 379440 ||  || — || February 2, 2000 || Kitt Peak || Spacewatch || — || align=right | 2.5 km || 
|-id=441 bgcolor=#d6d6d6
| 379441 ||  || — || January 6, 2010 || Kitt Peak || Spacewatch || — || align=right | 4.2 km || 
|-id=442 bgcolor=#d6d6d6
| 379442 ||  || — || February 13, 2010 || Mount Lemmon || Mount Lemmon Survey || — || align=right | 3.2 km || 
|-id=443 bgcolor=#d6d6d6
| 379443 ||  || — || February 13, 2010 || Mount Lemmon || Mount Lemmon Survey || 7:4 || align=right | 5.2 km || 
|-id=444 bgcolor=#d6d6d6
| 379444 ||  || — || February 13, 2010 || Mount Lemmon || Mount Lemmon Survey || — || align=right | 4.3 km || 
|-id=445 bgcolor=#d6d6d6
| 379445 ||  || — || February 13, 2010 || Kitt Peak || Spacewatch || THM || align=right | 2.5 km || 
|-id=446 bgcolor=#d6d6d6
| 379446 ||  || — || February 14, 2010 || Kitt Peak || Spacewatch || — || align=right | 2.2 km || 
|-id=447 bgcolor=#d6d6d6
| 379447 ||  || — || February 14, 2010 || Kitt Peak || Spacewatch || THM || align=right | 2.8 km || 
|-id=448 bgcolor=#d6d6d6
| 379448 ||  || — || March 9, 2005 || Mount Lemmon || Mount Lemmon Survey || — || align=right | 2.5 km || 
|-id=449 bgcolor=#d6d6d6
| 379449 ||  || — || February 14, 2010 || Mount Lemmon || Mount Lemmon Survey || — || align=right | 2.5 km || 
|-id=450 bgcolor=#d6d6d6
| 379450 ||  || — || September 12, 2007 || Mount Lemmon || Mount Lemmon Survey || — || align=right | 2.4 km || 
|-id=451 bgcolor=#E9E9E9
| 379451 ||  || — || February 14, 2010 || Mount Lemmon || Mount Lemmon Survey || — || align=right | 1.9 km || 
|-id=452 bgcolor=#d6d6d6
| 379452 ||  || — || February 14, 2010 || Mount Lemmon || Mount Lemmon Survey || THM || align=right | 2.9 km || 
|-id=453 bgcolor=#d6d6d6
| 379453 ||  || — || February 14, 2010 || Mount Lemmon || Mount Lemmon Survey || EMA || align=right | 3.4 km || 
|-id=454 bgcolor=#E9E9E9
| 379454 ||  || — || February 15, 2010 || Kitt Peak || Spacewatch || HOF || align=right | 2.6 km || 
|-id=455 bgcolor=#d6d6d6
| 379455 ||  || — || March 1, 2005 || Kitt Peak || Spacewatch || — || align=right | 2.3 km || 
|-id=456 bgcolor=#d6d6d6
| 379456 ||  || — || February 13, 2010 || Catalina || CSS || — || align=right | 4.3 km || 
|-id=457 bgcolor=#d6d6d6
| 379457 ||  || — || February 15, 2010 || Kitt Peak || Spacewatch || — || align=right | 4.0 km || 
|-id=458 bgcolor=#d6d6d6
| 379458 ||  || — || February 15, 2010 || Kitt Peak || Spacewatch || — || align=right | 5.6 km || 
|-id=459 bgcolor=#d6d6d6
| 379459 ||  || — || February 15, 2010 || Kitt Peak || Spacewatch || — || align=right | 2.8 km || 
|-id=460 bgcolor=#d6d6d6
| 379460 ||  || — || February 15, 2010 || Kitt Peak || Spacewatch || — || align=right | 2.5 km || 
|-id=461 bgcolor=#d6d6d6
| 379461 ||  || — || February 6, 2010 || Mount Lemmon || Mount Lemmon Survey || — || align=right | 2.6 km || 
|-id=462 bgcolor=#d6d6d6
| 379462 ||  || — || February 10, 2010 || Kitt Peak || Spacewatch || — || align=right | 2.9 km || 
|-id=463 bgcolor=#d6d6d6
| 379463 ||  || — || February 15, 2010 || Kitt Peak || Spacewatch || — || align=right | 3.2 km || 
|-id=464 bgcolor=#d6d6d6
| 379464 ||  || — || February 10, 2010 || Kitt Peak || Spacewatch || — || align=right | 3.2 km || 
|-id=465 bgcolor=#d6d6d6
| 379465 ||  || — || February 10, 2010 || Kitt Peak || Spacewatch || — || align=right | 4.3 km || 
|-id=466 bgcolor=#d6d6d6
| 379466 ||  || — || February 15, 2010 || Haleakala || Pan-STARRS || EOS || align=right | 2.1 km || 
|-id=467 bgcolor=#d6d6d6
| 379467 ||  || — || February 15, 2010 || Haleakala || Pan-STARRS || — || align=right | 4.7 km || 
|-id=468 bgcolor=#d6d6d6
| 379468 ||  || — || February 15, 2010 || Mount Lemmon || Mount Lemmon Survey || VER || align=right | 2.7 km || 
|-id=469 bgcolor=#d6d6d6
| 379469 ||  || — || February 5, 2010 || Kitt Peak || Spacewatch || — || align=right | 4.0 km || 
|-id=470 bgcolor=#d6d6d6
| 379470 ||  || — || February 16, 2010 || Mount Lemmon || Mount Lemmon Survey || — || align=right | 2.4 km || 
|-id=471 bgcolor=#d6d6d6
| 379471 ||  || — || February 20, 2010 || WISE || WISE || EUP || align=right | 4.1 km || 
|-id=472 bgcolor=#d6d6d6
| 379472 ||  || — || February 16, 2010 || Haleakala || M. Micheli || — || align=right | 2.9 km || 
|-id=473 bgcolor=#d6d6d6
| 379473 ||  || — || February 17, 2010 || Mount Lemmon || Mount Lemmon Survey || — || align=right | 2.5 km || 
|-id=474 bgcolor=#d6d6d6
| 379474 ||  || — || February 13, 2010 || Kitt Peak || Spacewatch || — || align=right | 3.2 km || 
|-id=475 bgcolor=#d6d6d6
| 379475 ||  || — || February 17, 2010 || Kitt Peak || Spacewatch || EOS || align=right | 2.3 km || 
|-id=476 bgcolor=#E9E9E9
| 379476 ||  || — || February 17, 2010 || Catalina || CSS || — || align=right | 3.7 km || 
|-id=477 bgcolor=#d6d6d6
| 379477 ||  || — || February 18, 2010 || Catalina || CSS || — || align=right | 2.9 km || 
|-id=478 bgcolor=#E9E9E9
| 379478 ||  || — || February 11, 2002 || Socorro || LINEAR || — || align=right | 2.8 km || 
|-id=479 bgcolor=#E9E9E9
| 379479 ||  || — || March 4, 2010 || WISE || WISE || — || align=right | 2.3 km || 
|-id=480 bgcolor=#d6d6d6
| 379480 ||  || — || March 6, 1999 || Kitt Peak || Spacewatch || — || align=right | 2.8 km || 
|-id=481 bgcolor=#d6d6d6
| 379481 ||  || — || March 15, 2010 || Dauban || F. Kugel || — || align=right | 3.6 km || 
|-id=482 bgcolor=#d6d6d6
| 379482 ||  || — || March 12, 2010 || Mount Lemmon || Mount Lemmon Survey || — || align=right | 3.9 km || 
|-id=483 bgcolor=#d6d6d6
| 379483 ||  || — || September 20, 1996 || Kitt Peak || Spacewatch || — || align=right | 3.1 km || 
|-id=484 bgcolor=#d6d6d6
| 379484 ||  || — || March 14, 2010 || Mount Lemmon || Mount Lemmon Survey || VER || align=right | 3.4 km || 
|-id=485 bgcolor=#d6d6d6
| 379485 ||  || — || March 14, 2010 || Kitt Peak || Spacewatch || HYG || align=right | 2.8 km || 
|-id=486 bgcolor=#E9E9E9
| 379486 ||  || — || March 13, 2010 || Catalina || CSS || — || align=right | 2.7 km || 
|-id=487 bgcolor=#d6d6d6
| 379487 ||  || — || March 12, 2010 || Catalina || CSS || URS || align=right | 4.2 km || 
|-id=488 bgcolor=#d6d6d6
| 379488 ||  || — || March 12, 2010 || Kitt Peak || Spacewatch || — || align=right | 3.2 km || 
|-id=489 bgcolor=#d6d6d6
| 379489 ||  || — || March 12, 2010 || Mount Lemmon || Mount Lemmon Survey || — || align=right | 3.7 km || 
|-id=490 bgcolor=#d6d6d6
| 379490 ||  || — || March 12, 2010 || Mount Lemmon || Mount Lemmon Survey || HYG || align=right | 2.7 km || 
|-id=491 bgcolor=#d6d6d6
| 379491 ||  || — || March 12, 2010 || Catalina || CSS || — || align=right | 3.3 km || 
|-id=492 bgcolor=#d6d6d6
| 379492 ||  || — || March 12, 2010 || Mount Lemmon || Mount Lemmon Survey || — || align=right | 3.1 km || 
|-id=493 bgcolor=#d6d6d6
| 379493 ||  || — || March 13, 2010 || Mount Lemmon || Mount Lemmon Survey || THM || align=right | 2.2 km || 
|-id=494 bgcolor=#d6d6d6
| 379494 ||  || — || December 22, 2003 || Kitt Peak || Spacewatch || — || align=right | 2.8 km || 
|-id=495 bgcolor=#d6d6d6
| 379495 ||  || — || March 9, 2010 || Siding Spring || SSS || — || align=right | 3.0 km || 
|-id=496 bgcolor=#d6d6d6
| 379496 ||  || — || March 15, 2010 || Catalina || CSS || — || align=right | 2.9 km || 
|-id=497 bgcolor=#d6d6d6
| 379497 ||  || — || March 18, 2010 || Mount Lemmon || Mount Lemmon Survey || SYL7:4 || align=right | 4.8 km || 
|-id=498 bgcolor=#d6d6d6
| 379498 ||  || — || March 17, 2010 || Kitt Peak || Spacewatch || — || align=right | 4.3 km || 
|-id=499 bgcolor=#E9E9E9
| 379499 ||  || — || December 20, 2009 || Catalina || CSS || — || align=right | 2.1 km || 
|-id=500 bgcolor=#d6d6d6
| 379500 ||  || — || March 20, 2010 || Catalina || CSS || EMA || align=right | 5.1 km || 
|}

379501–379600 

|-bgcolor=#d6d6d6
| 379501 ||  || — || March 26, 2010 || Kitt Peak || Spacewatch || — || align=right | 4.4 km || 
|-id=502 bgcolor=#d6d6d6
| 379502 ||  || — || September 13, 2007 || Mount Lemmon || Mount Lemmon Survey || — || align=right | 2.8 km || 
|-id=503 bgcolor=#d6d6d6
| 379503 ||  || — || March 21, 2010 || Catalina || CSS || — || align=right | 4.4 km || 
|-id=504 bgcolor=#E9E9E9
| 379504 ||  || — || April 14, 2010 || WISE || WISE || PAL || align=right | 3.3 km || 
|-id=505 bgcolor=#d6d6d6
| 379505 ||  || — || October 18, 2007 || Mount Lemmon || Mount Lemmon Survey || — || align=right | 3.4 km || 
|-id=506 bgcolor=#d6d6d6
| 379506 ||  || — || April 7, 2010 || Kitt Peak || Spacewatch || AEG || align=right | 3.0 km || 
|-id=507 bgcolor=#d6d6d6
| 379507 ||  || — || April 4, 2010 || Kitt Peak || Spacewatch || — || align=right | 2.4 km || 
|-id=508 bgcolor=#d6d6d6
| 379508 ||  || — || April 11, 2010 || Mount Lemmon || Mount Lemmon Survey || — || align=right | 3.7 km || 
|-id=509 bgcolor=#d6d6d6
| 379509 ||  || — || April 5, 2010 || Catalina || CSS || — || align=right | 5.9 km || 
|-id=510 bgcolor=#d6d6d6
| 379510 ||  || — || April 14, 2010 || Mount Lemmon || Mount Lemmon Survey || — || align=right | 4.1 km || 
|-id=511 bgcolor=#C2FFFF
| 379511 ||  || — || April 18, 2010 || WISE || WISE || L5 || align=right | 10 km || 
|-id=512 bgcolor=#d6d6d6
| 379512 ||  || — || April 26, 2010 || WISE || WISE || — || align=right | 4.4 km || 
|-id=513 bgcolor=#d6d6d6
| 379513 ||  || — || May 4, 2010 || Catalina || CSS || ALA || align=right | 4.2 km || 
|-id=514 bgcolor=#FA8072
| 379514 ||  || — || May 11, 2010 || Kitt Peak || Spacewatch || H || align=right data-sort-value="0.63" | 630 m || 
|-id=515 bgcolor=#d6d6d6
| 379515 ||  || — || May 7, 2010 || Mount Lemmon || Mount Lemmon Survey || LIX || align=right | 4.7 km || 
|-id=516 bgcolor=#d6d6d6
| 379516 ||  || — || June 1, 2010 || WISE || WISE || — || align=right | 3.9 km || 
|-id=517 bgcolor=#d6d6d6
| 379517 ||  || — || February 2, 2009 || Mount Lemmon || Mount Lemmon Survey || ALA || align=right | 3.1 km || 
|-id=518 bgcolor=#d6d6d6
| 379518 ||  || — || June 8, 2010 || WISE || WISE || — || align=right | 5.0 km || 
|-id=519 bgcolor=#fefefe
| 379519 ||  || — || June 9, 2010 || WISE || WISE || — || align=right | 2.0 km || 
|-id=520 bgcolor=#FA8072
| 379520 ||  || — || May 17, 2001 || Socorro || LINEAR || — || align=right | 2.3 km || 
|-id=521 bgcolor=#d6d6d6
| 379521 ||  || — || July 27, 2010 || WISE || WISE || — || align=right | 5.0 km || 
|-id=522 bgcolor=#E9E9E9
| 379522 ||  || — || October 17, 2010 || Mount Lemmon || Mount Lemmon Survey || — || align=right | 1.2 km || 
|-id=523 bgcolor=#fefefe
| 379523 ||  || — || December 4, 2007 || Mount Lemmon || Mount Lemmon Survey || — || align=right data-sort-value="0.64" | 640 m || 
|-id=524 bgcolor=#fefefe
| 379524 ||  || — || August 10, 2010 || Kitt Peak || Spacewatch || — || align=right data-sort-value="0.87" | 870 m || 
|-id=525 bgcolor=#fefefe
| 379525 ||  || — || December 5, 2007 || Kitt Peak || Spacewatch || — || align=right data-sort-value="0.77" | 770 m || 
|-id=526 bgcolor=#fefefe
| 379526 ||  || — || March 28, 2009 || Mount Lemmon || Mount Lemmon Survey || — || align=right data-sort-value="0.71" | 710 m || 
|-id=527 bgcolor=#E9E9E9
| 379527 ||  || — || November 23, 2006 || Mount Lemmon || Mount Lemmon Survey || BRU || align=right | 3.4 km || 
|-id=528 bgcolor=#fefefe
| 379528 ||  || — || November 9, 2007 || Kitt Peak || Spacewatch || — || align=right data-sort-value="0.70" | 700 m || 
|-id=529 bgcolor=#fefefe
| 379529 ||  || — || December 30, 2007 || Mount Lemmon || Mount Lemmon Survey || — || align=right data-sort-value="0.86" | 860 m || 
|-id=530 bgcolor=#fefefe
| 379530 ||  || — || September 18, 2010 || Mount Lemmon || Mount Lemmon Survey || — || align=right data-sort-value="0.77" | 770 m || 
|-id=531 bgcolor=#C2FFFF
| 379531 ||  || — || September 26, 2009 || Kitt Peak || Spacewatch || L4 || align=right | 7.1 km || 
|-id=532 bgcolor=#fefefe
| 379532 ||  || — || February 4, 2005 || Kitt Peak || Spacewatch || — || align=right data-sort-value="0.70" | 700 m || 
|-id=533 bgcolor=#fefefe
| 379533 ||  || — || May 24, 2006 || Mount Lemmon || Mount Lemmon Survey || — || align=right data-sort-value="0.83" | 830 m || 
|-id=534 bgcolor=#fefefe
| 379534 ||  || — || December 4, 2007 || Kitt Peak || Spacewatch || — || align=right data-sort-value="0.59" | 590 m || 
|-id=535 bgcolor=#fefefe
| 379535 ||  || — || April 11, 2005 || Mount Lemmon || Mount Lemmon Survey || — || align=right data-sort-value="0.83" | 830 m || 
|-id=536 bgcolor=#fefefe
| 379536 ||  || — || January 15, 2008 || Mount Lemmon || Mount Lemmon Survey || — || align=right data-sort-value="0.68" | 680 m || 
|-id=537 bgcolor=#fefefe
| 379537 ||  || — || November 27, 2010 || Mount Lemmon || Mount Lemmon Survey || — || align=right data-sort-value="0.74" | 740 m || 
|-id=538 bgcolor=#fefefe
| 379538 ||  || — || March 11, 2002 || Kitt Peak || Spacewatch || — || align=right data-sort-value="0.66" | 660 m || 
|-id=539 bgcolor=#fefefe
| 379539 ||  || — || October 20, 2007 || Mount Lemmon || Mount Lemmon Survey || — || align=right data-sort-value="0.74" | 740 m || 
|-id=540 bgcolor=#fefefe
| 379540 ||  || — || December 19, 2007 || Mount Lemmon || Mount Lemmon Survey || — || align=right data-sort-value="0.80" | 800 m || 
|-id=541 bgcolor=#fefefe
| 379541 ||  || — || December 29, 2003 || Kitt Peak || Spacewatch || — || align=right data-sort-value="0.62" | 620 m || 
|-id=542 bgcolor=#fefefe
| 379542 ||  || — || February 12, 2008 || Mount Lemmon || Mount Lemmon Survey || — || align=right data-sort-value="0.84" | 840 m || 
|-id=543 bgcolor=#fefefe
| 379543 ||  || — || October 31, 2006 || Mount Lemmon || Mount Lemmon Survey || NYS || align=right data-sort-value="0.61" | 610 m || 
|-id=544 bgcolor=#fefefe
| 379544 ||  || — || November 15, 2010 || Mount Lemmon || Mount Lemmon Survey || FLO || align=right data-sort-value="0.74" | 740 m || 
|-id=545 bgcolor=#E9E9E9
| 379545 ||  || — || September 21, 2009 || Mount Lemmon || Mount Lemmon Survey || — || align=right | 2.6 km || 
|-id=546 bgcolor=#d6d6d6
| 379546 ||  || — || December 9, 2010 || Kitt Peak || Spacewatch || — || align=right | 4.1 km || 
|-id=547 bgcolor=#fefefe
| 379547 ||  || — || December 9, 2006 || Kitt Peak || Spacewatch || V || align=right data-sort-value="0.76" | 760 m || 
|-id=548 bgcolor=#E9E9E9
| 379548 ||  || — || December 21, 2006 || Kitt Peak || Spacewatch || — || align=right | 1.1 km || 
|-id=549 bgcolor=#fefefe
| 379549 ||  || — || March 10, 2008 || Mount Lemmon || Mount Lemmon Survey || NYS || align=right data-sort-value="0.66" | 660 m || 
|-id=550 bgcolor=#fefefe
| 379550 ||  || — || August 28, 2009 || Kitt Peak || Spacewatch || — || align=right data-sort-value="0.87" | 870 m || 
|-id=551 bgcolor=#fefefe
| 379551 ||  || — || March 6, 2008 || Mount Lemmon || Mount Lemmon Survey || FLO || align=right data-sort-value="0.95" | 950 m || 
|-id=552 bgcolor=#fefefe
| 379552 ||  || — || September 18, 2006 || Kitt Peak || Spacewatch || FLO || align=right data-sort-value="0.55" | 550 m || 
|-id=553 bgcolor=#fefefe
| 379553 ||  || — || September 20, 2006 || Kitt Peak || Spacewatch || FLO || align=right data-sort-value="0.57" | 570 m || 
|-id=554 bgcolor=#E9E9E9
| 379554 ||  || — || January 10, 2011 || Mount Lemmon || Mount Lemmon Survey || — || align=right | 1.8 km || 
|-id=555 bgcolor=#fefefe
| 379555 ||  || — || September 19, 2006 || Kitt Peak || Spacewatch || — || align=right data-sort-value="0.65" | 650 m || 
|-id=556 bgcolor=#fefefe
| 379556 ||  || — || January 21, 2004 || Socorro || LINEAR || FLO || align=right data-sort-value="0.74" | 740 m || 
|-id=557 bgcolor=#fefefe
| 379557 ||  || — || August 19, 2006 || Kitt Peak || Spacewatch || — || align=right data-sort-value="0.72" | 720 m || 
|-id=558 bgcolor=#E9E9E9
| 379558 ||  || — || February 6, 2007 || Kitt Peak || Spacewatch || KON || align=right | 2.9 km || 
|-id=559 bgcolor=#fefefe
| 379559 ||  || — || December 12, 2006 || Kitt Peak || Spacewatch || MAS || align=right data-sort-value="0.76" | 760 m || 
|-id=560 bgcolor=#fefefe
| 379560 ||  || — || February 17, 2004 || Kitt Peak || Spacewatch || — || align=right data-sort-value="0.92" | 920 m || 
|-id=561 bgcolor=#fefefe
| 379561 ||  || — || November 20, 2006 || Kitt Peak || Spacewatch || MAS || align=right data-sort-value="0.59" | 590 m || 
|-id=562 bgcolor=#fefefe
| 379562 ||  || — || January 3, 2011 || Mount Lemmon || Mount Lemmon Survey || — || align=right data-sort-value="0.87" | 870 m || 
|-id=563 bgcolor=#fefefe
| 379563 ||  || — || September 21, 2009 || Mount Lemmon || Mount Lemmon Survey || — || align=right data-sort-value="0.88" | 880 m || 
|-id=564 bgcolor=#fefefe
| 379564 ||  || — || November 19, 2006 || Catalina || CSS || — || align=right | 1.2 km || 
|-id=565 bgcolor=#fefefe
| 379565 ||  || — || January 22, 2004 || Socorro || LINEAR || — || align=right data-sort-value="0.65" | 650 m || 
|-id=566 bgcolor=#fefefe
| 379566 ||  || — || February 11, 2004 || Kitt Peak || Spacewatch || NYScritical || align=right data-sort-value="0.72" | 720 m || 
|-id=567 bgcolor=#fefefe
| 379567 ||  || — || February 28, 2008 || Kitt Peak || Spacewatch || NYS || align=right data-sort-value="0.50" | 500 m || 
|-id=568 bgcolor=#E9E9E9
| 379568 ||  || — || December 5, 2010 || Mount Lemmon || Mount Lemmon Survey || — || align=right | 1.7 km || 
|-id=569 bgcolor=#fefefe
| 379569 ||  || — || February 14, 2004 || Kitt Peak || Spacewatch || EUT || align=right data-sort-value="0.54" | 540 m || 
|-id=570 bgcolor=#fefefe
| 379570 ||  || — || September 28, 2006 || Kitt Peak || Spacewatch || FLO || align=right data-sort-value="0.62" | 620 m || 
|-id=571 bgcolor=#fefefe
| 379571 ||  || — || May 16, 2004 || Kitt Peak || Spacewatch || MAS || align=right data-sort-value="0.86" | 860 m || 
|-id=572 bgcolor=#fefefe
| 379572 ||  || — || September 19, 2006 || Catalina || CSS || — || align=right data-sort-value="0.67" | 670 m || 
|-id=573 bgcolor=#fefefe
| 379573 ||  || — || October 23, 2006 || Mount Lemmon || Mount Lemmon Survey || — || align=right data-sort-value="0.96" | 960 m || 
|-id=574 bgcolor=#E9E9E9
| 379574 ||  || — || September 13, 2004 || Kitt Peak || Spacewatch || EUN || align=right | 1.8 km || 
|-id=575 bgcolor=#E9E9E9
| 379575 ||  || — || November 26, 2005 || Mount Lemmon || Mount Lemmon Survey || — || align=right | 1.6 km || 
|-id=576 bgcolor=#fefefe
| 379576 ||  || — || February 16, 2004 || Kitt Peak || Spacewatch || — || align=right data-sort-value="0.73" | 730 m || 
|-id=577 bgcolor=#fefefe
| 379577 ||  || — || September 21, 2009 || Mount Lemmon || Mount Lemmon Survey || ERI || align=right | 1.8 km || 
|-id=578 bgcolor=#fefefe
| 379578 ||  || — || November 16, 2006 || Kitt Peak || Spacewatch || — || align=right data-sort-value="0.81" | 810 m || 
|-id=579 bgcolor=#fefefe
| 379579 ||  || — || December 1, 2006 || Mount Lemmon || Mount Lemmon Survey || — || align=right data-sort-value="0.83" | 830 m || 
|-id=580 bgcolor=#E9E9E9
| 379580 ||  || — || April 28, 2003 || Kitt Peak || Spacewatch || WIT || align=right | 1.1 km || 
|-id=581 bgcolor=#fefefe
| 379581 ||  || — || September 26, 2006 || Kitt Peak || Spacewatch || — || align=right data-sort-value="0.69" | 690 m || 
|-id=582 bgcolor=#fefefe
| 379582 ||  || — || January 19, 2004 || Kitt Peak || Spacewatch || — || align=right data-sort-value="0.70" | 700 m || 
|-id=583 bgcolor=#E9E9E9
| 379583 ||  || — || November 20, 2009 || Mount Lemmon || Mount Lemmon Survey || — || align=right | 1.6 km || 
|-id=584 bgcolor=#fefefe
| 379584 ||  || — || November 16, 2006 || Kitt Peak || Spacewatch || NYS || align=right data-sort-value="0.76" | 760 m || 
|-id=585 bgcolor=#E9E9E9
| 379585 ||  || — || March 31, 2003 || Anderson Mesa || LONEOS || — || align=right | 1.2 km || 
|-id=586 bgcolor=#fefefe
| 379586 ||  || — || August 18, 2006 || Kitt Peak || Spacewatch || — || align=right data-sort-value="0.69" | 690 m || 
|-id=587 bgcolor=#fefefe
| 379587 ||  || — || September 18, 2009 || Kitt Peak || Spacewatch || V || align=right data-sort-value="0.73" | 730 m || 
|-id=588 bgcolor=#fefefe
| 379588 ||  || — || October 4, 2006 || Mount Lemmon || Mount Lemmon Survey || FLO || align=right data-sort-value="0.65" | 650 m || 
|-id=589 bgcolor=#E9E9E9
| 379589 ||  || — || December 5, 2010 || Mount Lemmon || Mount Lemmon Survey || EUN || align=right | 1.4 km || 
|-id=590 bgcolor=#fefefe
| 379590 ||  || — || July 15, 2005 || Kitt Peak || Spacewatch || — || align=right data-sort-value="0.94" | 940 m || 
|-id=591 bgcolor=#fefefe
| 379591 ||  || — || February 27, 2000 || Kitt Peak || Spacewatch || NYS || align=right data-sort-value="0.80" | 800 m || 
|-id=592 bgcolor=#fefefe
| 379592 ||  || — || October 28, 2006 || Catalina || CSS || — || align=right | 1.1 km || 
|-id=593 bgcolor=#E9E9E9
| 379593 ||  || — || November 5, 2005 || Kitt Peak || Spacewatch || — || align=right | 1.0 km || 
|-id=594 bgcolor=#fefefe
| 379594 ||  || — || October 23, 2006 || Kitt Peak || Spacewatch || — || align=right data-sort-value="0.70" | 700 m || 
|-id=595 bgcolor=#E9E9E9
| 379595 ||  || — || November 30, 2005 || Kitt Peak || Spacewatch || MRX || align=right | 1.4 km || 
|-id=596 bgcolor=#fefefe
| 379596 ||  || — || October 2, 2006 || Mount Lemmon || Mount Lemmon Survey || NYS || align=right data-sort-value="0.70" | 700 m || 
|-id=597 bgcolor=#fefefe
| 379597 ||  || — || December 8, 2010 || Mount Lemmon || Mount Lemmon Survey || — || align=right data-sort-value="0.76" | 760 m || 
|-id=598 bgcolor=#fefefe
| 379598 ||  || — || January 27, 2011 || Mount Lemmon || Mount Lemmon Survey || V || align=right data-sort-value="0.70" | 700 m || 
|-id=599 bgcolor=#fefefe
| 379599 ||  || — || November 20, 2006 || Kitt Peak || Spacewatch || MAS || align=right data-sort-value="0.72" | 720 m || 
|-id=600 bgcolor=#fefefe
| 379600 ||  || — || April 29, 2000 || Socorro || LINEAR || — || align=right | 1.3 km || 
|}

379601–379700 

|-bgcolor=#fefefe
| 379601 ||  || — || August 15, 2009 || Catalina || CSS || V || align=right data-sort-value="0.76" | 760 m || 
|-id=602 bgcolor=#fefefe
| 379602 ||  || — || October 16, 2006 || Catalina || CSS || — || align=right data-sort-value="0.94" | 940 m || 
|-id=603 bgcolor=#fefefe
| 379603 ||  || — || May 14, 2004 || Kitt Peak || Spacewatch || — || align=right data-sort-value="0.77" | 770 m || 
|-id=604 bgcolor=#fefefe
| 379604 ||  || — || August 16, 2009 || Kitt Peak || Spacewatch || — || align=right data-sort-value="0.85" | 850 m || 
|-id=605 bgcolor=#E9E9E9
| 379605 ||  || — || January 28, 2007 || Mount Lemmon || Mount Lemmon Survey || — || align=right data-sort-value="0.90" | 900 m || 
|-id=606 bgcolor=#fefefe
| 379606 ||  || — || September 17, 2009 || Kitt Peak || Spacewatch || — || align=right data-sort-value="0.78" | 780 m || 
|-id=607 bgcolor=#fefefe
| 379607 ||  || — || January 10, 2007 || Kitt Peak || Spacewatch || — || align=right data-sort-value="0.81" | 810 m || 
|-id=608 bgcolor=#fefefe
| 379608 ||  || — || January 8, 2007 || Kitt Peak || Spacewatch || MAS || align=right data-sort-value="0.81" | 810 m || 
|-id=609 bgcolor=#fefefe
| 379609 ||  || — || March 15, 2004 || Socorro || LINEAR || NYS || align=right data-sort-value="0.78" | 780 m || 
|-id=610 bgcolor=#d6d6d6
| 379610 ||  || — || January 24, 2006 || Anderson Mesa || LONEOS || — || align=right | 4.0 km || 
|-id=611 bgcolor=#fefefe
| 379611 ||  || — || November 20, 2003 || Socorro || LINEAR || FLO || align=right data-sort-value="0.75" | 750 m || 
|-id=612 bgcolor=#E9E9E9
| 379612 ||  || — || August 8, 2004 || Socorro || LINEAR || — || align=right | 1.6 km || 
|-id=613 bgcolor=#E9E9E9
| 379613 ||  || — || September 29, 2005 || Catalina || CSS || — || align=right | 1.1 km || 
|-id=614 bgcolor=#E9E9E9
| 379614 ||  || — || December 2, 2005 || Mount Lemmon || Mount Lemmon Survey || — || align=right | 1.3 km || 
|-id=615 bgcolor=#fefefe
| 379615 ||  || — || November 18, 2006 || Kitt Peak || Spacewatch || NYS || align=right data-sort-value="0.71" | 710 m || 
|-id=616 bgcolor=#fefefe
| 379616 ||  || — || December 9, 2006 || Kitt Peak || Spacewatch || — || align=right data-sort-value="0.81" | 810 m || 
|-id=617 bgcolor=#fefefe
| 379617 ||  || — || August 15, 2009 || Catalina || CSS || — || align=right data-sort-value="0.89" | 890 m || 
|-id=618 bgcolor=#E9E9E9
| 379618 ||  || — || October 28, 2005 || Kitt Peak || Spacewatch || — || align=right | 1.1 km || 
|-id=619 bgcolor=#fefefe
| 379619 ||  || — || February 4, 2000 || Kitt Peak || Spacewatch || NYS || align=right data-sort-value="0.60" | 600 m || 
|-id=620 bgcolor=#fefefe
| 379620 ||  || — || February 23, 2004 || Socorro || LINEAR || — || align=right data-sort-value="0.68" | 680 m || 
|-id=621 bgcolor=#fefefe
| 379621 ||  || — || December 26, 2006 || Catalina || CSS || — || align=right | 1.1 km || 
|-id=622 bgcolor=#fefefe
| 379622 ||  || — || March 3, 2000 || Socorro || LINEAR || — || align=right data-sort-value="0.96" | 960 m || 
|-id=623 bgcolor=#E9E9E9
| 379623 ||  || — || November 8, 2009 || Mount Lemmon || Mount Lemmon Survey || — || align=right data-sort-value="0.88" | 880 m || 
|-id=624 bgcolor=#E9E9E9
| 379624 ||  || — || January 14, 2010 || WISE || WISE || ADE || align=right | 2.2 km || 
|-id=625 bgcolor=#fefefe
| 379625 ||  || — || November 18, 1998 || Kitt Peak || Spacewatch || — || align=right data-sort-value="0.87" | 870 m || 
|-id=626 bgcolor=#E9E9E9
| 379626 ||  || — || December 27, 2005 || Kitt Peak || Spacewatch || — || align=right | 2.5 km || 
|-id=627 bgcolor=#fefefe
| 379627 ||  || — || January 16, 2011 || Mount Lemmon || Mount Lemmon Survey || V || align=right data-sort-value="0.65" | 650 m || 
|-id=628 bgcolor=#E9E9E9
| 379628 ||  || — || September 25, 2009 || Catalina || CSS || — || align=right | 1.7 km || 
|-id=629 bgcolor=#fefefe
| 379629 ||  || — || April 30, 2008 || Mount Lemmon || Mount Lemmon Survey || — || align=right data-sort-value="0.82" | 820 m || 
|-id=630 bgcolor=#fefefe
| 379630 ||  || — || September 28, 2006 || Mount Lemmon || Mount Lemmon Survey || — || align=right data-sort-value="0.79" | 790 m || 
|-id=631 bgcolor=#E9E9E9
| 379631 ||  || — || February 10, 2011 || Mount Lemmon || Mount Lemmon Survey || — || align=right | 1.3 km || 
|-id=632 bgcolor=#fefefe
| 379632 ||  || — || January 25, 2007 || Kitt Peak || Spacewatch || — || align=right data-sort-value="0.73" | 730 m || 
|-id=633 bgcolor=#E9E9E9
| 379633 ||  || — || February 26, 2011 || Kitt Peak || Spacewatch || NEM || align=right | 2.6 km || 
|-id=634 bgcolor=#fefefe
| 379634 ||  || — || September 15, 2009 || Kitt Peak || Spacewatch || — || align=right | 1.3 km || 
|-id=635 bgcolor=#fefefe
| 379635 ||  || — || November 20, 2006 || Kitt Peak || Spacewatch || MAS || align=right data-sort-value="0.82" | 820 m || 
|-id=636 bgcolor=#fefefe
| 379636 ||  || — || January 8, 2011 || Mount Lemmon || Mount Lemmon Survey || — || align=right data-sort-value="0.87" | 870 m || 
|-id=637 bgcolor=#E9E9E9
| 379637 ||  || — || October 26, 2005 || Kitt Peak || Spacewatch || — || align=right data-sort-value="0.99" | 990 m || 
|-id=638 bgcolor=#E9E9E9
| 379638 ||  || — || September 15, 2004 || Kitt Peak || Spacewatch || — || align=right | 1.7 km || 
|-id=639 bgcolor=#E9E9E9
| 379639 ||  || — || February 26, 2007 || Mount Lemmon || Mount Lemmon Survey || — || align=right | 1.5 km || 
|-id=640 bgcolor=#fefefe
| 379640 ||  || — || December 11, 2006 || Kitt Peak || Spacewatch || NYS || align=right data-sort-value="0.76" | 760 m || 
|-id=641 bgcolor=#E9E9E9
| 379641 ||  || — || October 26, 2005 || Kitt Peak || Spacewatch || — || align=right data-sort-value="0.96" | 960 m || 
|-id=642 bgcolor=#E9E9E9
| 379642 ||  || — || February 17, 2007 || Mount Lemmon || Mount Lemmon Survey || — || align=right | 1.2 km || 
|-id=643 bgcolor=#fefefe
| 379643 ||  || — || December 22, 2003 || Kitt Peak || Spacewatch || — || align=right data-sort-value="0.53" | 530 m || 
|-id=644 bgcolor=#d6d6d6
| 379644 ||  || — || September 7, 1996 || Kitt Peak || Spacewatch || — || align=right | 3.2 km || 
|-id=645 bgcolor=#E9E9E9
| 379645 ||  || — || April 11, 2007 || Siding Spring || SSS || — || align=right | 1.4 km || 
|-id=646 bgcolor=#fefefe
| 379646 ||  || — || November 21, 2006 || Mount Lemmon || Mount Lemmon Survey || NYS || align=right data-sort-value="0.59" | 590 m || 
|-id=647 bgcolor=#fefefe
| 379647 ||  || — || January 5, 2000 || Kitt Peak || Spacewatch || ERI || align=right | 2.0 km || 
|-id=648 bgcolor=#E9E9E9
| 379648 ||  || — || September 7, 2004 || Kitt Peak || Spacewatch || WIT || align=right | 1.2 km || 
|-id=649 bgcolor=#fefefe
| 379649 ||  || — || January 24, 2007 || Catalina || CSS || — || align=right | 1.1 km || 
|-id=650 bgcolor=#E9E9E9
| 379650 ||  || — || February 16, 2007 || Mount Lemmon || Mount Lemmon Survey || — || align=right | 1.5 km || 
|-id=651 bgcolor=#fefefe
| 379651 ||  || — || January 10, 2003 || Socorro || LINEAR || — || align=right data-sort-value="0.99" | 990 m || 
|-id=652 bgcolor=#E9E9E9
| 379652 ||  || — || April 22, 2007 || Mount Lemmon || Mount Lemmon Survey || — || align=right | 1.1 km || 
|-id=653 bgcolor=#E9E9E9
| 379653 ||  || — || February 26, 2007 || Mount Lemmon || Mount Lemmon Survey || — || align=right | 1.2 km || 
|-id=654 bgcolor=#E9E9E9
| 379654 ||  || — || January 29, 2011 || Kitt Peak || Spacewatch || GEF || align=right | 1.5 km || 
|-id=655 bgcolor=#E9E9E9
| 379655 ||  || — || November 17, 2009 || Kitt Peak || Spacewatch || WIT || align=right | 1.1 km || 
|-id=656 bgcolor=#d6d6d6
| 379656 ||  || — || March 13, 2005 || Kitt Peak || Spacewatch || URS || align=right | 3.6 km || 
|-id=657 bgcolor=#E9E9E9
| 379657 ||  || — || March 16, 2007 || Mount Lemmon || Mount Lemmon Survey || — || align=right | 1.7 km || 
|-id=658 bgcolor=#fefefe
| 379658 ||  || — || September 15, 1998 || Kitt Peak || Spacewatch || — || align=right data-sort-value="0.75" | 750 m || 
|-id=659 bgcolor=#E9E9E9
| 379659 ||  || — || November 9, 2009 || Kitt Peak || Spacewatch || — || align=right | 1.1 km || 
|-id=660 bgcolor=#fefefe
| 379660 ||  || — || December 14, 2006 || Kitt Peak || Spacewatch || V || align=right data-sort-value="0.74" | 740 m || 
|-id=661 bgcolor=#E9E9E9
| 379661 ||  || — || April 18, 2007 || Kitt Peak || Spacewatch || — || align=right | 1.9 km || 
|-id=662 bgcolor=#fefefe
| 379662 ||  || — || September 15, 2009 || Kitt Peak || Spacewatch || — || align=right data-sort-value="0.90" | 900 m || 
|-id=663 bgcolor=#E9E9E9
| 379663 ||  || — || January 29, 2007 || Kitt Peak || Spacewatch || — || align=right | 1.5 km || 
|-id=664 bgcolor=#E9E9E9
| 379664 ||  || — || January 7, 2006 || Kitt Peak || Spacewatch || — || align=right | 2.5 km || 
|-id=665 bgcolor=#E9E9E9
| 379665 ||  || — || December 24, 2006 || Kitt Peak || Spacewatch || — || align=right | 1.7 km || 
|-id=666 bgcolor=#E9E9E9
| 379666 ||  || — || April 14, 2007 || Mount Lemmon || Mount Lemmon Survey || — || align=right | 2.9 km || 
|-id=667 bgcolor=#d6d6d6
| 379667 ||  || — || February 9, 2005 || Kitt Peak || Spacewatch || THM || align=right | 2.9 km || 
|-id=668 bgcolor=#E9E9E9
| 379668 ||  || — || February 26, 2007 || Mount Lemmon || Mount Lemmon Survey || KON || align=right | 2.5 km || 
|-id=669 bgcolor=#E9E9E9
| 379669 ||  || — || March 14, 2007 || Mount Lemmon || Mount Lemmon Survey || WIT || align=right | 1.3 km || 
|-id=670 bgcolor=#fefefe
| 379670 ||  || — || October 19, 2006 || Mount Lemmon || Mount Lemmon Survey || PHO || align=right data-sort-value="0.75" | 750 m || 
|-id=671 bgcolor=#fefefe
| 379671 ||  || — || February 16, 2007 || Catalina || CSS || — || align=right | 1.1 km || 
|-id=672 bgcolor=#E9E9E9
| 379672 ||  || — || April 11, 2003 || Kitt Peak || Spacewatch || — || align=right | 1.0 km || 
|-id=673 bgcolor=#d6d6d6
| 379673 ||  || — || November 24, 2009 || Kitt Peak || Spacewatch || CHA || align=right | 2.2 km || 
|-id=674 bgcolor=#d6d6d6
| 379674 ||  || — || September 29, 2008 || Mount Lemmon || Mount Lemmon Survey || — || align=right | 3.0 km || 
|-id=675 bgcolor=#E9E9E9
| 379675 ||  || — || November 9, 2009 || Mount Lemmon || Mount Lemmon Survey || HEN || align=right | 1.1 km || 
|-id=676 bgcolor=#E9E9E9
| 379676 ||  || — || May 10, 2007 || Mount Lemmon || Mount Lemmon Survey || MIS || align=right | 2.6 km || 
|-id=677 bgcolor=#E9E9E9
| 379677 ||  || — || April 15, 2007 || Mount Lemmon || Mount Lemmon Survey || — || align=right | 1.1 km || 
|-id=678 bgcolor=#E9E9E9
| 379678 ||  || — || November 30, 2005 || Socorro || LINEAR || — || align=right | 1.4 km || 
|-id=679 bgcolor=#d6d6d6
| 379679 ||  || — || April 20, 2006 || Kitt Peak || Spacewatch || — || align=right | 2.5 km || 
|-id=680 bgcolor=#d6d6d6
| 379680 ||  || — || November 3, 2008 || Catalina || CSS || — || align=right | 3.9 km || 
|-id=681 bgcolor=#E9E9E9
| 379681 ||  || — || October 15, 2004 || Mount Lemmon || Mount Lemmon Survey || — || align=right | 2.3 km || 
|-id=682 bgcolor=#d6d6d6
| 379682 ||  || — || September 12, 2007 || Mount Lemmon || Mount Lemmon Survey || — || align=right | 3.3 km || 
|-id=683 bgcolor=#E9E9E9
| 379683 ||  || — || October 18, 1995 || Kitt Peak || Spacewatch || — || align=right | 2.2 km || 
|-id=684 bgcolor=#E9E9E9
| 379684 ||  || — || October 30, 1999 || Kitt Peak || Spacewatch || — || align=right | 2.6 km || 
|-id=685 bgcolor=#E9E9E9
| 379685 ||  || — || October 8, 2004 || Kitt Peak || Spacewatch || — || align=right | 3.0 km || 
|-id=686 bgcolor=#E9E9E9
| 379686 ||  || — || October 25, 2005 || Kitt Peak || Spacewatch || — || align=right | 1.2 km || 
|-id=687 bgcolor=#E9E9E9
| 379687 ||  || — || October 6, 2004 || Kitt Peak || Spacewatch || WIT || align=right | 1.1 km || 
|-id=688 bgcolor=#E9E9E9
| 379688 ||  || — || October 9, 2004 || Kitt Peak || Spacewatch || — || align=right | 2.7 km || 
|-id=689 bgcolor=#d6d6d6
| 379689 ||  || — || May 1, 2006 || Kitt Peak || Spacewatch || — || align=right | 2.5 km || 
|-id=690 bgcolor=#E9E9E9
| 379690 ||  || — || November 17, 2009 || Mount Lemmon || Mount Lemmon Survey || DOR || align=right | 2.4 km || 
|-id=691 bgcolor=#d6d6d6
| 379691 ||  || — || April 1, 2010 || WISE || WISE || LIX || align=right | 3.8 km || 
|-id=692 bgcolor=#fefefe
| 379692 ||  || — || March 30, 2000 || Kitt Peak || Spacewatch || MAS || align=right data-sort-value="0.71" | 710 m || 
|-id=693 bgcolor=#E9E9E9
| 379693 ||  || — || September 23, 2008 || Kitt Peak || Spacewatch || — || align=right | 2.4 km || 
|-id=694 bgcolor=#fefefe
| 379694 ||  || — || December 24, 2006 || Kitt Peak || Spacewatch || MAS || align=right data-sort-value="0.68" | 680 m || 
|-id=695 bgcolor=#fefefe
| 379695 ||  || — || January 17, 2007 || Kitt Peak || Spacewatch || — || align=right data-sort-value="0.75" | 750 m || 
|-id=696 bgcolor=#E9E9E9
| 379696 ||  || — || April 28, 2007 || Kitt Peak || Spacewatch || — || align=right | 2.5 km || 
|-id=697 bgcolor=#E9E9E9
| 379697 ||  || — || September 7, 1999 || Socorro || LINEAR || — || align=right | 3.2 km || 
|-id=698 bgcolor=#E9E9E9
| 379698 ||  || — || March 26, 2007 || Mount Lemmon || Mount Lemmon Survey || HNS || align=right | 1.2 km || 
|-id=699 bgcolor=#E9E9E9
| 379699 ||  || — || October 5, 2004 || Kitt Peak || Spacewatch || — || align=right | 1.2 km || 
|-id=700 bgcolor=#E9E9E9
| 379700 ||  || — || October 7, 2004 || Kitt Peak || Spacewatch || — || align=right | 1.8 km || 
|}

379701–379800 

|-bgcolor=#fefefe
| 379701 ||  || — || February 10, 2011 || Mount Lemmon || Mount Lemmon Survey || NYS || align=right data-sort-value="0.66" | 660 m || 
|-id=702 bgcolor=#E9E9E9
| 379702 ||  || — || November 26, 2009 || Mount Lemmon || Mount Lemmon Survey || — || align=right | 1.8 km || 
|-id=703 bgcolor=#E9E9E9
| 379703 ||  || — || January 13, 2002 || Kitt Peak || Spacewatch || — || align=right | 2.0 km || 
|-id=704 bgcolor=#d6d6d6
| 379704 ||  || — || April 26, 2010 || WISE || WISE || — || align=right | 4.1 km || 
|-id=705 bgcolor=#E9E9E9
| 379705 ||  || — || September 15, 2004 || Kitt Peak || Spacewatch || — || align=right | 1.5 km || 
|-id=706 bgcolor=#E9E9E9
| 379706 ||  || — || February 4, 2006 || Catalina || CSS || — || align=right | 2.7 km || 
|-id=707 bgcolor=#E9E9E9
| 379707 ||  || — || February 7, 2002 || Socorro || LINEAR || — || align=right | 2.4 km || 
|-id=708 bgcolor=#d6d6d6
| 379708 ||  || — || October 20, 2008 || Kitt Peak || Spacewatch || EOS || align=right | 2.3 km || 
|-id=709 bgcolor=#d6d6d6
| 379709 ||  || — || April 19, 2006 || Kitt Peak || Spacewatch || — || align=right | 2.9 km || 
|-id=710 bgcolor=#fefefe
| 379710 ||  || — || January 27, 2007 || Mount Lemmon || Mount Lemmon Survey || — || align=right data-sort-value="0.75" | 750 m || 
|-id=711 bgcolor=#E9E9E9
| 379711 ||  || — || October 30, 2005 || Catalina || CSS || — || align=right | 2.5 km || 
|-id=712 bgcolor=#E9E9E9
| 379712 ||  || — || May 26, 2007 || Mount Lemmon || Mount Lemmon Survey || — || align=right | 1.6 km || 
|-id=713 bgcolor=#E9E9E9
| 379713 ||  || — || March 26, 2007 || Mount Lemmon || Mount Lemmon Survey || — || align=right | 1.7 km || 
|-id=714 bgcolor=#E9E9E9
| 379714 ||  || — || May 11, 2007 || Mount Lemmon || Mount Lemmon Survey || — || align=right | 1.6 km || 
|-id=715 bgcolor=#E9E9E9
| 379715 ||  || — || March 4, 2006 || Kitt Peak || Spacewatch || — || align=right | 1.9 km || 
|-id=716 bgcolor=#E9E9E9
| 379716 ||  || — || October 18, 1995 || Kitt Peak || Spacewatch || — || align=right | 2.0 km || 
|-id=717 bgcolor=#d6d6d6
| 379717 ||  || — || October 16, 2007 || Mount Lemmon || Mount Lemmon Survey || HYG || align=right | 3.2 km || 
|-id=718 bgcolor=#E9E9E9
| 379718 ||  || — || May 2, 2003 || Kitt Peak || Spacewatch || — || align=right | 1.8 km || 
|-id=719 bgcolor=#E9E9E9
| 379719 ||  || — || September 7, 2004 || Kitt Peak || Spacewatch || — || align=right | 1.4 km || 
|-id=720 bgcolor=#d6d6d6
| 379720 ||  || — || March 30, 2000 || Kitt Peak || Spacewatch || — || align=right | 3.6 km || 
|-id=721 bgcolor=#d6d6d6
| 379721 ||  || — || October 3, 2008 || Mount Lemmon || Mount Lemmon Survey || — || align=right | 2.5 km || 
|-id=722 bgcolor=#E9E9E9
| 379722 ||  || — || April 20, 2007 || Kitt Peak || Spacewatch || EUN || align=right | 1.2 km || 
|-id=723 bgcolor=#E9E9E9
| 379723 ||  || — || May 29, 2008 || Mount Lemmon || Mount Lemmon Survey || — || align=right | 2.5 km || 
|-id=724 bgcolor=#E9E9E9
| 379724 ||  || — || October 4, 2004 || Kitt Peak || Spacewatch || WIT || align=right data-sort-value="0.91" | 910 m || 
|-id=725 bgcolor=#E9E9E9
| 379725 ||  || — || February 2, 2006 || Kitt Peak || Spacewatch || — || align=right | 2.5 km || 
|-id=726 bgcolor=#E9E9E9
| 379726 ||  || — || January 27, 2006 || Mount Lemmon || Mount Lemmon Survey || — || align=right | 1.7 km || 
|-id=727 bgcolor=#E9E9E9
| 379727 ||  || — || January 7, 2006 || Kitt Peak || Spacewatch || — || align=right | 1.6 km || 
|-id=728 bgcolor=#E9E9E9
| 379728 ||  || — || January 25, 2010 || WISE || WISE || — || align=right | 1.2 km || 
|-id=729 bgcolor=#d6d6d6
| 379729 ||  || — || November 20, 2003 || Kitt Peak || Spacewatch || — || align=right | 2.8 km || 
|-id=730 bgcolor=#E9E9E9
| 379730 ||  || — || October 6, 1999 || Socorro || LINEAR || — || align=right | 2.8 km || 
|-id=731 bgcolor=#E9E9E9
| 379731 ||  || — || September 30, 2003 || Kitt Peak || Spacewatch || MRX || align=right | 1.1 km || 
|-id=732 bgcolor=#E9E9E9
| 379732 ||  || — || January 8, 2002 || Cima Ekar || ADAS || EUN || align=right | 1.4 km || 
|-id=733 bgcolor=#d6d6d6
| 379733 ||  || — || May 8, 2006 || Mount Lemmon || Mount Lemmon Survey || — || align=right | 2.3 km || 
|-id=734 bgcolor=#d6d6d6
| 379734 ||  || — || November 22, 2008 || Kitt Peak || Spacewatch || EOS || align=right | 3.0 km || 
|-id=735 bgcolor=#d6d6d6
| 379735 ||  || — || March 8, 2005 || Mount Lemmon || Mount Lemmon Survey || — || align=right | 2.7 km || 
|-id=736 bgcolor=#E9E9E9
| 379736 ||  || — || January 16, 2011 || Mount Lemmon || Mount Lemmon Survey || AER || align=right | 1.9 km || 
|-id=737 bgcolor=#E9E9E9
| 379737 ||  || — || March 12, 2007 || Mount Lemmon || Mount Lemmon Survey || — || align=right | 1.4 km || 
|-id=738 bgcolor=#E9E9E9
| 379738 ||  || — || November 9, 2009 || Socorro || LINEAR || — || align=right | 1.8 km || 
|-id=739 bgcolor=#d6d6d6
| 379739 ||  || — || November 9, 2008 || Kitt Peak || Spacewatch || — || align=right | 3.7 km || 
|-id=740 bgcolor=#d6d6d6
| 379740 ||  || — || May 6, 2006 || Mount Lemmon || Mount Lemmon Survey || — || align=right | 3.3 km || 
|-id=741 bgcolor=#E9E9E9
| 379741 ||  || — || December 9, 2004 || Catalina || CSS || — || align=right | 3.3 km || 
|-id=742 bgcolor=#E9E9E9
| 379742 ||  || — || November 2, 2008 || Mount Lemmon || Mount Lemmon Survey || — || align=right | 2.8 km || 
|-id=743 bgcolor=#E9E9E9
| 379743 ||  || — || January 9, 2002 || Socorro || LINEAR || — || align=right | 1.4 km || 
|-id=744 bgcolor=#d6d6d6
| 379744 ||  || — || May 2, 2005 || Kitt Peak || Spacewatch || — || align=right | 3.6 km || 
|-id=745 bgcolor=#d6d6d6
| 379745 ||  || — || May 7, 2006 || Kitt Peak || Spacewatch || — || align=right | 2.7 km || 
|-id=746 bgcolor=#E9E9E9
| 379746 ||  || — || December 18, 2009 || Kitt Peak || Spacewatch || — || align=right | 1.7 km || 
|-id=747 bgcolor=#d6d6d6
| 379747 ||  || — || November 20, 2008 || Mount Lemmon || Mount Lemmon Survey || — || align=right | 3.6 km || 
|-id=748 bgcolor=#d6d6d6
| 379748 ||  || — || March 11, 2005 || Kitt Peak || Spacewatch || — || align=right | 3.7 km || 
|-id=749 bgcolor=#E9E9E9
| 379749 ||  || — || October 3, 2008 || Mount Lemmon || Mount Lemmon Survey || — || align=right | 2.3 km || 
|-id=750 bgcolor=#E9E9E9
| 379750 ||  || — || January 26, 2006 || Mount Lemmon || Mount Lemmon Survey || — || align=right | 2.2 km || 
|-id=751 bgcolor=#d6d6d6
| 379751 ||  || — || March 10, 2005 || Anderson Mesa || LONEOS || — || align=right | 4.4 km || 
|-id=752 bgcolor=#E9E9E9
| 379752 ||  || — || April 19, 2002 || Kitt Peak || Spacewatch || — || align=right | 2.5 km || 
|-id=753 bgcolor=#E9E9E9
| 379753 ||  || — || October 22, 2005 || Kitt Peak || Spacewatch || — || align=right | 3.0 km || 
|-id=754 bgcolor=#d6d6d6
| 379754 ||  || — || October 27, 2008 || Mount Lemmon || Mount Lemmon Survey || — || align=right | 2.6 km || 
|-id=755 bgcolor=#d6d6d6
| 379755 ||  || — || March 2, 2011 || Mount Lemmon || Mount Lemmon Survey || — || align=right | 2.9 km || 
|-id=756 bgcolor=#d6d6d6
| 379756 ||  || — || May 31, 2006 || Mount Lemmon || Mount Lemmon Survey || — || align=right | 3.7 km || 
|-id=757 bgcolor=#E9E9E9
| 379757 ||  || — || November 29, 2000 || Kitt Peak || Spacewatch || — || align=right | 4.0 km || 
|-id=758 bgcolor=#d6d6d6
| 379758 ||  || — || October 26, 2008 || Mount Lemmon || Mount Lemmon Survey || — || align=right | 3.9 km || 
|-id=759 bgcolor=#E9E9E9
| 379759 ||  || — || March 28, 2011 || Kitt Peak || Spacewatch || — || align=right | 2.3 km || 
|-id=760 bgcolor=#E9E9E9
| 379760 ||  || — || March 20, 1998 || Socorro || LINEAR || — || align=right | 2.1 km || 
|-id=761 bgcolor=#d6d6d6
| 379761 ||  || — || March 9, 2005 || Catalina || CSS || TIR || align=right | 3.9 km || 
|-id=762 bgcolor=#E9E9E9
| 379762 ||  || — || December 17, 2001 || Socorro || LINEAR || MAR || align=right | 1.2 km || 
|-id=763 bgcolor=#E9E9E9
| 379763 ||  || — || October 8, 2008 || Catalina || CSS || — || align=right | 2.8 km || 
|-id=764 bgcolor=#d6d6d6
| 379764 ||  || — || April 6, 2011 || Mount Lemmon || Mount Lemmon Survey || — || align=right | 3.2 km || 
|-id=765 bgcolor=#E9E9E9
| 379765 ||  || — || March 27, 2011 || Kitt Peak || Spacewatch || GEF || align=right | 2.1 km || 
|-id=766 bgcolor=#d6d6d6
| 379766 ||  || — || October 31, 2008 || Kitt Peak || Spacewatch || — || align=right | 2.8 km || 
|-id=767 bgcolor=#d6d6d6
| 379767 ||  || — || March 23, 2001 || Cima Ekar || ADAS || — || align=right | 2.5 km || 
|-id=768 bgcolor=#E9E9E9
| 379768 ||  || — || November 2, 1999 || Kitt Peak || Spacewatch || — || align=right | 2.6 km || 
|-id=769 bgcolor=#d6d6d6
| 379769 ||  || — || May 6, 2010 || WISE || WISE || — || align=right | 4.5 km || 
|-id=770 bgcolor=#E9E9E9
| 379770 ||  || — || February 10, 2002 || Socorro || LINEAR || — || align=right | 1.3 km || 
|-id=771 bgcolor=#E9E9E9
| 379771 ||  || — || December 29, 2005 || Kitt Peak || Spacewatch || — || align=right | 1.7 km || 
|-id=772 bgcolor=#FA8072
| 379772 ||  || — || October 6, 2005 || Kitt Peak || Spacewatch || — || align=right data-sort-value="0.60" | 600 m || 
|-id=773 bgcolor=#E9E9E9
| 379773 ||  || — || October 7, 2000 || Kitt Peak || Spacewatch || — || align=right | 1.7 km || 
|-id=774 bgcolor=#E9E9E9
| 379774 ||  || — || April 6, 2011 || Kitt Peak || Spacewatch || GEF || align=right | 1.7 km || 
|-id=775 bgcolor=#d6d6d6
| 379775 ||  || — || December 1, 2008 || Kitt Peak || Spacewatch || — || align=right | 4.5 km || 
|-id=776 bgcolor=#d6d6d6
| 379776 ||  || — || October 12, 2007 || Catalina || CSS || — || align=right | 3.4 km || 
|-id=777 bgcolor=#d6d6d6
| 379777 ||  || — || September 14, 2007 || Catalina || CSS || EOS || align=right | 2.5 km || 
|-id=778 bgcolor=#d6d6d6
| 379778 ||  || — || May 22, 2006 || Kitt Peak || Spacewatch || — || align=right | 3.2 km || 
|-id=779 bgcolor=#d6d6d6
| 379779 ||  || — || February 16, 2010 || Kitt Peak || Spacewatch || EOS || align=right | 2.0 km || 
|-id=780 bgcolor=#d6d6d6
| 379780 ||  || — || February 25, 2011 || Mount Lemmon || Mount Lemmon Survey || — || align=right | 4.0 km || 
|-id=781 bgcolor=#d6d6d6
| 379781 ||  || — || July 11, 2004 || Socorro || LINEAR || 3:2 || align=right | 5.0 km || 
|-id=782 bgcolor=#E9E9E9
| 379782 ||  || — || December 17, 2001 || Kitt Peak || Spacewatch || — || align=right | 1.0 km || 
|-id=783 bgcolor=#E9E9E9
| 379783 ||  || — || November 26, 2009 || Mount Lemmon || Mount Lemmon Survey || — || align=right | 1.3 km || 
|-id=784 bgcolor=#E9E9E9
| 379784 ||  || — || January 27, 2006 || Mount Lemmon || Mount Lemmon Survey || — || align=right | 1.5 km || 
|-id=785 bgcolor=#d6d6d6
| 379785 ||  || — || January 8, 2010 || Kitt Peak || Spacewatch || — || align=right | 2.4 km || 
|-id=786 bgcolor=#E9E9E9
| 379786 ||  || — || January 25, 2006 || Kitt Peak || Spacewatch || — || align=right | 2.4 km || 
|-id=787 bgcolor=#d6d6d6
| 379787 ||  || — || September 13, 2007 || Mount Lemmon || Mount Lemmon Survey || — || align=right | 2.9 km || 
|-id=788 bgcolor=#E9E9E9
| 379788 ||  || — || December 17, 2009 || Mount Lemmon || Mount Lemmon Survey || HOF || align=right | 3.1 km || 
|-id=789 bgcolor=#E9E9E9
| 379789 ||  || — || February 1, 2006 || Kitt Peak || Spacewatch || — || align=right | 2.2 km || 
|-id=790 bgcolor=#E9E9E9
| 379790 ||  || — || December 6, 2005 || Kitt Peak || Spacewatch || — || align=right | 1.3 km || 
|-id=791 bgcolor=#E9E9E9
| 379791 ||  || — || April 25, 2007 || Mount Lemmon || Mount Lemmon Survey || — || align=right | 1.1 km || 
|-id=792 bgcolor=#d6d6d6
| 379792 ||  || — || April 14, 2005 || Catalina || CSS || EUP || align=right | 5.5 km || 
|-id=793 bgcolor=#d6d6d6
| 379793 ||  || — || March 9, 2005 || Catalina || CSS || — || align=right | 4.1 km || 
|-id=794 bgcolor=#E9E9E9
| 379794 ||  || — || November 21, 2005 || Catalina || CSS || — || align=right | 1.2 km || 
|-id=795 bgcolor=#E9E9E9
| 379795 ||  || — || November 25, 2009 || Catalina || CSS || — || align=right | 3.1 km || 
|-id=796 bgcolor=#E9E9E9
| 379796 ||  || — || October 29, 2005 || Mount Lemmon || Mount Lemmon Survey || — || align=right data-sort-value="0.95" | 950 m || 
|-id=797 bgcolor=#d6d6d6
| 379797 ||  || — || August 10, 2007 || Kitt Peak || Spacewatch || HYG || align=right | 2.5 km || 
|-id=798 bgcolor=#d6d6d6
| 379798 ||  || — || November 9, 2008 || Mount Lemmon || Mount Lemmon Survey || EOS || align=right | 2.0 km || 
|-id=799 bgcolor=#d6d6d6
| 379799 ||  || — || September 14, 2007 || Catalina || CSS || — || align=right | 4.7 km || 
|-id=800 bgcolor=#d6d6d6
| 379800 ||  || — || December 17, 2003 || Kitt Peak || Spacewatch || — || align=right | 4.5 km || 
|}

379801–379900 

|-bgcolor=#E9E9E9
| 379801 ||  || — || November 4, 2005 || Mount Lemmon || Mount Lemmon Survey || — || align=right data-sort-value="0.98" | 980 m || 
|-id=802 bgcolor=#d6d6d6
| 379802 ||  || — || March 14, 2010 || Mount Lemmon || Mount Lemmon Survey || — || align=right | 2.7 km || 
|-id=803 bgcolor=#d6d6d6
| 379803 ||  || — || May 31, 2000 || Kitt Peak || Spacewatch || EOS || align=right | 2.5 km || 
|-id=804 bgcolor=#d6d6d6
| 379804 ||  || — || April 6, 2005 || Mount Lemmon || Mount Lemmon Survey || EOS || align=right | 2.0 km || 
|-id=805 bgcolor=#d6d6d6
| 379805 ||  || — || February 7, 2011 || Mount Lemmon || Mount Lemmon Survey || — || align=right | 3.1 km || 
|-id=806 bgcolor=#d6d6d6
| 379806 ||  || — || November 9, 2008 || Kitt Peak || Spacewatch || — || align=right | 2.6 km || 
|-id=807 bgcolor=#d6d6d6
| 379807 ||  || — || September 4, 2007 || Mount Lemmon || Mount Lemmon Survey || — || align=right | 2.6 km || 
|-id=808 bgcolor=#d6d6d6
| 379808 ||  || — || October 24, 2003 || Kitt Peak || Spacewatch || — || align=right | 2.7 km || 
|-id=809 bgcolor=#E9E9E9
| 379809 ||  || — || October 3, 2008 || Mount Lemmon || Mount Lemmon Survey || NEM || align=right | 2.8 km || 
|-id=810 bgcolor=#d6d6d6
| 379810 ||  || — || April 26, 2000 || Kitt Peak || Spacewatch || — || align=right | 3.1 km || 
|-id=811 bgcolor=#E9E9E9
| 379811 ||  || — || March 3, 2006 || Catalina || CSS || — || align=right | 3.2 km || 
|-id=812 bgcolor=#E9E9E9
| 379812 ||  || — || September 25, 2008 || Kitt Peak || Spacewatch || MRX || align=right | 1.4 km || 
|-id=813 bgcolor=#d6d6d6
| 379813 ||  || — || September 9, 2007 || Kitt Peak || Spacewatch || EOS || align=right | 2.0 km || 
|-id=814 bgcolor=#d6d6d6
| 379814 ||  || — || May 5, 2011 || Siding Spring || SSS || TIR || align=right | 4.4 km || 
|-id=815 bgcolor=#d6d6d6
| 379815 ||  || — || April 2, 2005 || Mount Lemmon || Mount Lemmon Survey || THM || align=right | 2.3 km || 
|-id=816 bgcolor=#E9E9E9
| 379816 ||  || — || October 23, 2004 || Kitt Peak || Spacewatch || AEO || align=right | 1.4 km || 
|-id=817 bgcolor=#d6d6d6
| 379817 ||  || — || May 28, 2000 || Socorro || LINEAR || — || align=right | 3.8 km || 
|-id=818 bgcolor=#d6d6d6
| 379818 ||  || — || November 30, 2008 || Kitt Peak || Spacewatch || — || align=right | 4.4 km || 
|-id=819 bgcolor=#d6d6d6
| 379819 ||  || — || September 9, 2007 || Kitt Peak || Spacewatch || — || align=right | 4.6 km || 
|-id=820 bgcolor=#d6d6d6
| 379820 ||  || — || May 22, 2006 || Kitt Peak || Spacewatch || — || align=right | 2.4 km || 
|-id=821 bgcolor=#d6d6d6
| 379821 ||  || — || March 8, 2005 || Kitt Peak || Spacewatch || EOS || align=right | 1.7 km || 
|-id=822 bgcolor=#d6d6d6
| 379822 ||  || — || October 6, 2008 || Mount Lemmon || Mount Lemmon Survey || CHA || align=right | 2.2 km || 
|-id=823 bgcolor=#d6d6d6
| 379823 ||  || — || April 24, 2006 || Kitt Peak || Spacewatch || — || align=right | 2.2 km || 
|-id=824 bgcolor=#E9E9E9
| 379824 ||  || — || January 12, 2010 || Catalina || CSS || ADE || align=right | 2.4 km || 
|-id=825 bgcolor=#d6d6d6
| 379825 ||  || — || November 23, 1997 || Kitt Peak || Spacewatch || — || align=right | 3.3 km || 
|-id=826 bgcolor=#d6d6d6
| 379826 ||  || — || September 29, 1997 || Kitt Peak || Spacewatch || EMA || align=right | 3.4 km || 
|-id=827 bgcolor=#d6d6d6
| 379827 ||  || — || February 14, 2004 || Socorro || LINEAR || — || align=right | 4.1 km || 
|-id=828 bgcolor=#d6d6d6
| 379828 ||  || — || December 21, 2008 || Catalina || CSS || — || align=right | 4.2 km || 
|-id=829 bgcolor=#d6d6d6
| 379829 ||  || — || November 20, 2008 || Kitt Peak || Spacewatch || EOS || align=right | 2.0 km || 
|-id=830 bgcolor=#d6d6d6
| 379830 ||  || — || May 22, 2011 || Kitt Peak || Spacewatch || — || align=right | 3.7 km || 
|-id=831 bgcolor=#d6d6d6
| 379831 ||  || — || June 4, 2011 || Catalina || CSS || — || align=right | 4.1 km || 
|-id=832 bgcolor=#d6d6d6
| 379832 ||  || — || February 16, 2010 || Kitt Peak || Spacewatch || ALA || align=right | 3.8 km || 
|-id=833 bgcolor=#d6d6d6
| 379833 ||  || — || December 20, 2004 || Mount Lemmon || Mount Lemmon Survey || KOR || align=right | 2.0 km || 
|-id=834 bgcolor=#d6d6d6
| 379834 ||  || — || March 10, 2005 || Mount Lemmon || Mount Lemmon Survey || — || align=right | 2.7 km || 
|-id=835 bgcolor=#C2FFFF
| 379835 ||  || — || December 14, 2004 || Kitt Peak || Spacewatch || L5 || align=right | 13 km || 
|-id=836 bgcolor=#C2FFFF
| 379836 ||  || — || April 16, 2010 || WISE || WISE || L5 || align=right | 16 km || 
|-id=837 bgcolor=#C2FFFF
| 379837 ||  || — || April 9, 2010 || WISE || WISE || L5 || align=right | 14 km || 
|-id=838 bgcolor=#fefefe
| 379838 ||  || — || December 18, 2004 || Mount Lemmon || Mount Lemmon Survey || — || align=right data-sort-value="0.86" | 860 m || 
|-id=839 bgcolor=#C2FFFF
| 379839 ||  || — || April 19, 2010 || WISE || WISE || L5 || align=right | 8.3 km || 
|-id=840 bgcolor=#C2FFFF
| 379840 ||  || — || October 2, 1999 || Kitt Peak || Spacewatch || L5 || align=right | 8.3 km || 
|-id=841 bgcolor=#FA8072
| 379841 ||  || — || August 22, 2001 || Socorro || LINEAR || — || align=right data-sort-value="0.83" | 830 m || 
|-id=842 bgcolor=#d6d6d6
| 379842 ||  || — || November 27, 2006 || Kitt Peak || Spacewatch || fast? || align=right | 2.6 km || 
|-id=843 bgcolor=#fefefe
| 379843 ||  || — || December 28, 2003 || Kitt Peak || Spacewatch || H || align=right data-sort-value="0.66" | 660 m || 
|-id=844 bgcolor=#C2FFFF
| 379844 ||  || — || December 27, 2011 || Mount Lemmon || Mount Lemmon Survey || L4 || align=right | 11 km || 
|-id=845 bgcolor=#d6d6d6
| 379845 ||  || — || October 24, 2005 || Kitt Peak || Spacewatch || — || align=right | 2.2 km || 
|-id=846 bgcolor=#d6d6d6
| 379846 ||  || — || March 10, 2007 || Kitt Peak || Spacewatch || MRC || align=right | 2.2 km || 
|-id=847 bgcolor=#fefefe
| 379847 ||  || — || August 29, 2006 || Catalina || CSS || V || align=right data-sort-value="0.86" | 860 m || 
|-id=848 bgcolor=#fefefe
| 379848 ||  || — || August 31, 2005 || Anderson Mesa || LONEOS || H || align=right data-sort-value="0.91" | 910 m || 
|-id=849 bgcolor=#fefefe
| 379849 ||  || — || November 6, 1999 || Kitt Peak || Spacewatch || H || align=right data-sort-value="0.47" | 470 m || 
|-id=850 bgcolor=#fefefe
| 379850 ||  || — || April 27, 2009 || Catalina || CSS || — || align=right data-sort-value="0.82" | 820 m || 
|-id=851 bgcolor=#fefefe
| 379851 ||  || — || January 13, 2008 || Kitt Peak || Spacewatch || — || align=right data-sort-value="0.75" | 750 m || 
|-id=852 bgcolor=#fefefe
| 379852 ||  || — || October 28, 2005 || Mount Lemmon || Mount Lemmon Survey || H || align=right data-sort-value="0.52" | 520 m || 
|-id=853 bgcolor=#E9E9E9
| 379853 ||  || — || March 29, 2008 || Catalina || CSS || — || align=right | 2.9 km || 
|-id=854 bgcolor=#fefefe
| 379854 ||  || — || January 10, 2008 || Kitt Peak || Spacewatch || NYS || align=right data-sort-value="0.64" | 640 m || 
|-id=855 bgcolor=#fefefe
| 379855 ||  || — || November 2, 2007 || Kitt Peak || Spacewatch || — || align=right data-sort-value="0.86" | 860 m || 
|-id=856 bgcolor=#fefefe
| 379856 ||  || — || September 21, 2003 || Kitt Peak || Spacewatch || — || align=right data-sort-value="0.75" | 750 m || 
|-id=857 bgcolor=#fefefe
| 379857 ||  || — || October 17, 2010 || Mount Lemmon || Mount Lemmon Survey || — || align=right data-sort-value="0.94" | 940 m || 
|-id=858 bgcolor=#fefefe
| 379858 ||  || — || September 10, 2010 || Mount Lemmon || Mount Lemmon Survey || FLO || align=right data-sort-value="0.72" | 720 m || 
|-id=859 bgcolor=#E9E9E9
| 379859 ||  || — || May 10, 2008 || Siding Spring || SSS || — || align=right | 1.2 km || 
|-id=860 bgcolor=#fefefe
| 379860 ||  || — || June 22, 2006 || Kitt Peak || Spacewatch || — || align=right data-sort-value="0.73" | 730 m || 
|-id=861 bgcolor=#fefefe
| 379861 ||  || — || March 11, 2005 || Mount Lemmon || Mount Lemmon Survey || — || align=right data-sort-value="0.71" | 710 m || 
|-id=862 bgcolor=#fefefe
| 379862 ||  || — || April 19, 2007 || Mount Lemmon || Mount Lemmon Survey || H || align=right data-sort-value="0.82" | 820 m || 
|-id=863 bgcolor=#fefefe
| 379863 ||  || — || April 22, 2007 || Kitt Peak || Spacewatch || H || align=right data-sort-value="0.77" | 770 m || 
|-id=864 bgcolor=#E9E9E9
| 379864 ||  || — || January 6, 2010 || Kitt Peak || Spacewatch || — || align=right | 3.0 km || 
|-id=865 bgcolor=#fefefe
| 379865 ||  || — || April 9, 2005 || Kitt Peak || Spacewatch || — || align=right data-sort-value="0.89" | 890 m || 
|-id=866 bgcolor=#fefefe
| 379866 ||  || — || September 18, 2006 || Catalina || CSS || V || align=right data-sort-value="0.70" | 700 m || 
|-id=867 bgcolor=#d6d6d6
| 379867 ||  || — || March 13, 2007 || Kitt Peak || Spacewatch || BRA || align=right | 1.3 km || 
|-id=868 bgcolor=#fefefe
| 379868 ||  || — || October 4, 2010 || Mount Lemmon || Mount Lemmon Survey || H || align=right data-sort-value="0.71" | 710 m || 
|-id=869 bgcolor=#fefefe
| 379869 ||  || — || December 13, 2006 || Kitt Peak || Spacewatch || — || align=right | 1.1 km || 
|-id=870 bgcolor=#d6d6d6
| 379870 ||  || — || October 27, 2008 || Mount Lemmon || Mount Lemmon Survey || — || align=right | 4.0 km || 
|-id=871 bgcolor=#fefefe
| 379871 ||  || — || October 5, 2002 || Socorro || LINEAR || H || align=right data-sort-value="0.62" | 620 m || 
|-id=872 bgcolor=#fefefe
| 379872 ||  || — || February 9, 2005 || Mount Lemmon || Mount Lemmon Survey || — || align=right data-sort-value="0.70" | 700 m || 
|-id=873 bgcolor=#fefefe
| 379873 ||  || — || February 7, 2002 || Kitt Peak || Spacewatch || — || align=right data-sort-value="0.72" | 720 m || 
|-id=874 bgcolor=#fefefe
| 379874 ||  || — || October 12, 2010 || Mount Lemmon || Mount Lemmon Survey || — || align=right data-sort-value="0.84" | 840 m || 
|-id=875 bgcolor=#d6d6d6
| 379875 ||  || — || July 19, 2007 || Siding Spring || SSS || — || align=right | 3.1 km || 
|-id=876 bgcolor=#fefefe
| 379876 ||  || — || October 14, 1999 || Kitt Peak || Spacewatch || FLO || align=right data-sort-value="0.61" | 610 m || 
|-id=877 bgcolor=#fefefe
| 379877 ||  || — || November 9, 1994 || Kitt Peak || Spacewatch || H || align=right data-sort-value="0.45" | 450 m || 
|-id=878 bgcolor=#E9E9E9
| 379878 ||  || — || October 1, 2005 || Mount Lemmon || Mount Lemmon Survey || — || align=right | 1.2 km || 
|-id=879 bgcolor=#E9E9E9
| 379879 ||  || — || August 2, 2008 || Siding Spring || SSS || — || align=right | 3.1 km || 
|-id=880 bgcolor=#fefefe
| 379880 ||  || — || August 26, 2009 || Catalina || CSS || NYS || align=right data-sort-value="0.72" | 720 m || 
|-id=881 bgcolor=#E9E9E9
| 379881 ||  || — || February 17, 2007 || Kitt Peak || Spacewatch || — || align=right | 1.6 km || 
|-id=882 bgcolor=#fefefe
| 379882 ||  || — || March 13, 2008 || Mount Lemmon || Mount Lemmon Survey || — || align=right data-sort-value="0.72" | 720 m || 
|-id=883 bgcolor=#fefefe
| 379883 ||  || — || January 1, 2008 || Kitt Peak || Spacewatch || — || align=right data-sort-value="0.87" | 870 m || 
|-id=884 bgcolor=#E9E9E9
| 379884 ||  || — || September 12, 2009 || Kitt Peak || Spacewatch || — || align=right | 2.2 km || 
|-id=885 bgcolor=#fefefe
| 379885 ||  || — || March 11, 2008 || Kitt Peak || Spacewatch || NYS || align=right data-sort-value="0.63" | 630 m || 
|-id=886 bgcolor=#fefefe
| 379886 ||  || — || September 25, 2009 || Kitt Peak || Spacewatch || NYS || align=right data-sort-value="0.68" | 680 m || 
|-id=887 bgcolor=#fefefe
| 379887 ||  || — || February 25, 2012 || Mount Lemmon || Mount Lemmon Survey || V || align=right data-sort-value="0.72" | 720 m || 
|-id=888 bgcolor=#E9E9E9
| 379888 ||  || — || December 2, 2005 || Mount Lemmon || Mount Lemmon Survey || — || align=right | 1.1 km || 
|-id=889 bgcolor=#E9E9E9
| 379889 ||  || — || November 3, 2005 || Mount Lemmon || Mount Lemmon Survey || — || align=right | 1.2 km || 
|-id=890 bgcolor=#fefefe
| 379890 ||  || — || October 10, 1999 || Socorro || LINEAR || H || align=right data-sort-value="0.66" | 660 m || 
|-id=891 bgcolor=#fefefe
| 379891 ||  || — || February 10, 2008 || Kitt Peak || Spacewatch || — || align=right data-sort-value="0.78" | 780 m || 
|-id=892 bgcolor=#E9E9E9
| 379892 ||  || — || August 4, 2008 || Siding Spring || SSS || — || align=right | 2.6 km || 
|-id=893 bgcolor=#fefefe
| 379893 ||  || — || February 7, 2008 || Kitt Peak || Spacewatch || NYS || align=right data-sort-value="0.66" | 660 m || 
|-id=894 bgcolor=#fefefe
| 379894 ||  || — || January 19, 2008 || Kitt Peak || Spacewatch || — || align=right data-sort-value="0.71" | 710 m || 
|-id=895 bgcolor=#fefefe
| 379895 ||  || — || October 18, 2006 || Kitt Peak || Spacewatch || V || align=right data-sort-value="0.77" | 770 m || 
|-id=896 bgcolor=#E9E9E9
| 379896 ||  || — || February 16, 2007 || Mount Lemmon || Mount Lemmon Survey || — || align=right | 1.7 km || 
|-id=897 bgcolor=#E9E9E9
| 379897 ||  || — || March 26, 2003 || Anderson Mesa || LONEOS || EUN || align=right | 1.5 km || 
|-id=898 bgcolor=#E9E9E9
| 379898 ||  || — || September 2, 2000 || Prescott || P. G. Comba || RAF || align=right data-sort-value="0.82" | 820 m || 
|-id=899 bgcolor=#fefefe
| 379899 ||  || — || September 28, 2006 || Mount Lemmon || Mount Lemmon Survey || — || align=right data-sort-value="0.81" | 810 m || 
|-id=900 bgcolor=#E9E9E9
| 379900 ||  || — || July 2, 2008 || Kitt Peak || Spacewatch || GEF || align=right | 1.2 km || 
|}

379901–380000 

|-bgcolor=#fefefe
| 379901 ||  || — || June 3, 2006 || Mount Lemmon || Mount Lemmon Survey || — || align=right data-sort-value="0.79" | 790 m || 
|-id=902 bgcolor=#fefefe
| 379902 ||  || — || March 11, 2005 || Kitt Peak || Spacewatch || FLO || align=right data-sort-value="0.66" | 660 m || 
|-id=903 bgcolor=#E9E9E9
| 379903 ||  || — || October 12, 2009 || Mount Lemmon || Mount Lemmon Survey || — || align=right | 1.9 km || 
|-id=904 bgcolor=#fefefe
| 379904 ||  || — || June 9, 2005 || Kitt Peak || Spacewatch || — || align=right | 1.00 km || 
|-id=905 bgcolor=#d6d6d6
| 379905 ||  || — || September 22, 2008 || Mount Lemmon || Mount Lemmon Survey || — || align=right | 3.3 km || 
|-id=906 bgcolor=#fefefe
| 379906 ||  || — || December 10, 2010 || Mount Lemmon || Mount Lemmon Survey || — || align=right data-sort-value="0.75" | 750 m || 
|-id=907 bgcolor=#E9E9E9
| 379907 ||  || — || October 27, 2005 || Kitt Peak || Spacewatch || — || align=right data-sort-value="0.98" | 980 m || 
|-id=908 bgcolor=#d6d6d6
| 379908 ||  || — || November 26, 2009 || Mount Lemmon || Mount Lemmon Survey || — || align=right | 2.4 km || 
|-id=909 bgcolor=#E9E9E9
| 379909 ||  || — || December 1, 2005 || Mount Lemmon || Mount Lemmon Survey || — || align=right data-sort-value="0.99" | 990 m || 
|-id=910 bgcolor=#E9E9E9
| 379910 ||  || — || October 14, 2004 || Kitt Peak || Spacewatch || — || align=right | 2.2 km || 
|-id=911 bgcolor=#fefefe
| 379911 ||  || — || September 30, 2006 || Mount Lemmon || Mount Lemmon Survey || — || align=right data-sort-value="0.91" | 910 m || 
|-id=912 bgcolor=#fefefe
| 379912 ||  || — || April 27, 2009 || Mount Lemmon || Mount Lemmon Survey || — || align=right data-sort-value="0.72" | 720 m || 
|-id=913 bgcolor=#fefefe
| 379913 ||  || — || April 5, 2008 || Mount Lemmon || Mount Lemmon Survey || — || align=right data-sort-value="0.64" | 640 m || 
|-id=914 bgcolor=#fefefe
| 379914 ||  || — || November 16, 2006 || Kitt Peak || Spacewatch || V || align=right data-sort-value="0.70" | 700 m || 
|-id=915 bgcolor=#E9E9E9
| 379915 ||  || — || October 11, 2005 || Kitt Peak || Spacewatch || — || align=right | 1.1 km || 
|-id=916 bgcolor=#fefefe
| 379916 ||  || — || April 1, 2005 || Kitt Peak || Spacewatch || FLO || align=right data-sort-value="0.74" | 740 m || 
|-id=917 bgcolor=#fefefe
| 379917 ||  || — || August 15, 2009 || Siding Spring || SSS || — || align=right | 1.3 km || 
|-id=918 bgcolor=#fefefe
| 379918 ||  || — || February 8, 2008 || Mount Lemmon || Mount Lemmon Survey || ERI || align=right | 1.8 km || 
|-id=919 bgcolor=#E9E9E9
| 379919 ||  || — || December 6, 2005 || Kitt Peak || Spacewatch || — || align=right | 1.9 km || 
|-id=920 bgcolor=#E9E9E9
| 379920 ||  || — || September 24, 1960 || Palomar || PLS || — || align=right | 1.3 km || 
|-id=921 bgcolor=#E9E9E9
| 379921 ||  || — || November 30, 2005 || Kitt Peak || Spacewatch || — || align=right | 1.5 km || 
|-id=922 bgcolor=#E9E9E9
| 379922 ||  || — || December 27, 2006 || Mount Lemmon || Mount Lemmon Survey || — || align=right | 2.5 km || 
|-id=923 bgcolor=#fefefe
| 379923 ||  || — || May 8, 2005 || Kitt Peak || Spacewatch || FLO || align=right data-sort-value="0.75" | 750 m || 
|-id=924 bgcolor=#E9E9E9
| 379924 ||  || — || January 29, 2011 || Mount Lemmon || Mount Lemmon Survey || — || align=right | 1.3 km || 
|-id=925 bgcolor=#E9E9E9
| 379925 ||  || — || August 29, 2000 || Socorro || LINEAR || — || align=right | 1.3 km || 
|-id=926 bgcolor=#E9E9E9
| 379926 ||  || — || March 16, 2007 || Catalina || CSS || — || align=right | 3.3 km || 
|-id=927 bgcolor=#E9E9E9
| 379927 ||  || — || March 26, 2003 || Kitt Peak || Spacewatch || — || align=right | 1.5 km || 
|-id=928 bgcolor=#E9E9E9
| 379928 ||  || — || October 18, 2009 || Mount Lemmon || Mount Lemmon Survey || — || align=right | 2.0 km || 
|-id=929 bgcolor=#fefefe
| 379929 ||  || — || October 23, 2006 || Mount Lemmon || Mount Lemmon Survey || V || align=right data-sort-value="0.76" | 760 m || 
|-id=930 bgcolor=#d6d6d6
| 379930 ||  || — || October 21, 2003 || Kitt Peak || Spacewatch || EOS || align=right | 2.2 km || 
|-id=931 bgcolor=#fefefe
| 379931 ||  || — || June 5, 2005 || Kitt Peak || Spacewatch || — || align=right | 1.0 km || 
|-id=932 bgcolor=#E9E9E9
| 379932 ||  || — || November 24, 2000 || Kitt Peak || Spacewatch || — || align=right | 3.2 km || 
|-id=933 bgcolor=#d6d6d6
| 379933 ||  || — || April 25, 2006 || Catalina || CSS || — || align=right | 4.4 km || 
|-id=934 bgcolor=#E9E9E9
| 379934 ||  || — || October 6, 2004 || Kitt Peak || Spacewatch || — || align=right | 2.5 km || 
|-id=935 bgcolor=#E9E9E9
| 379935 ||  || — || September 29, 2009 || Mount Lemmon || Mount Lemmon Survey || MAR || align=right | 1.0 km || 
|-id=936 bgcolor=#fefefe
| 379936 ||  || — || May 24, 2001 || Kitt Peak || Spacewatch || — || align=right data-sort-value="0.99" | 990 m || 
|-id=937 bgcolor=#E9E9E9
| 379937 ||  || — || November 4, 2004 || Kitt Peak || Spacewatch || ADE || align=right | 2.5 km || 
|-id=938 bgcolor=#d6d6d6
| 379938 ||  || — || April 21, 2012 || Mount Lemmon || Mount Lemmon Survey || — || align=right | 2.8 km || 
|-id=939 bgcolor=#fefefe
| 379939 ||  || — || February 12, 2008 || Mount Lemmon || Mount Lemmon Survey || V || align=right data-sort-value="0.61" | 610 m || 
|-id=940 bgcolor=#d6d6d6
| 379940 ||  || — || September 23, 2008 || Kitt Peak || Spacewatch || ALA || align=right | 3.2 km || 
|-id=941 bgcolor=#fefefe
| 379941 ||  || — || July 4, 2005 || Mount Lemmon || Mount Lemmon Survey || V || align=right data-sort-value="0.92" | 920 m || 
|-id=942 bgcolor=#fefefe
| 379942 ||  || — || December 16, 2007 || Mount Lemmon || Mount Lemmon Survey || — || align=right data-sort-value="0.90" | 900 m || 
|-id=943 bgcolor=#fefefe
| 379943 ||  || — || December 14, 2010 || Mount Lemmon || Mount Lemmon Survey || — || align=right data-sort-value="0.74" | 740 m || 
|-id=944 bgcolor=#fefefe
| 379944 ||  || — || September 4, 2003 || Kitt Peak || Spacewatch || — || align=right data-sort-value="0.86" | 860 m || 
|-id=945 bgcolor=#fefefe
| 379945 ||  || — || March 29, 2008 || Catalina || CSS || V || align=right data-sort-value="0.72" | 720 m || 
|-id=946 bgcolor=#fefefe
| 379946 ||  || — || June 27, 2005 || Kitt Peak || Spacewatch || V || align=right data-sort-value="0.62" | 620 m || 
|-id=947 bgcolor=#d6d6d6
| 379947 ||  || — || September 24, 2008 || Mount Lemmon || Mount Lemmon Survey || EOS || align=right | 2.2 km || 
|-id=948 bgcolor=#d6d6d6
| 379948 ||  || — || September 11, 2007 || XuYi || PMO NEO || EOS || align=right | 2.4 km || 
|-id=949 bgcolor=#C2FFFF
| 379949 ||  || — || January 25, 2006 || Kitt Peak || Spacewatch || L5 || align=right | 12 km || 
|-id=950 bgcolor=#fefefe
| 379950 ||  || — || January 27, 2010 || WISE || WISE || — || align=right | 3.4 km || 
|-id=951 bgcolor=#E9E9E9
| 379951 ||  || — || September 5, 2008 || Kitt Peak || Spacewatch || WIT || align=right | 1.1 km || 
|-id=952 bgcolor=#d6d6d6
| 379952 ||  || — || January 11, 2010 || Kitt Peak || Spacewatch || — || align=right | 3.6 km || 
|-id=953 bgcolor=#d6d6d6
| 379953 ||  || — || March 13, 2005 || Catalina || CSS || EOS || align=right | 2.6 km || 
|-id=954 bgcolor=#d6d6d6
| 379954 ||  || — || June 21, 2006 || Kitt Peak || Spacewatch || — || align=right | 4.0 km || 
|-id=955 bgcolor=#d6d6d6
| 379955 ||  || — || January 17, 2010 || Kitt Peak || Spacewatch || — || align=right | 4.3 km || 
|-id=956 bgcolor=#d6d6d6
| 379956 ||  || — || January 9, 2006 || Kitt Peak || Spacewatch || YAK || align=right | 2.8 km || 
|-id=957 bgcolor=#d6d6d6
| 379957 ||  || — || December 4, 2008 || Kitt Peak || Spacewatch || — || align=right | 3.4 km || 
|-id=958 bgcolor=#d6d6d6
| 379958 ||  || — || November 18, 1996 || Kitt Peak || Spacewatch || VER || align=right | 2.9 km || 
|-id=959 bgcolor=#d6d6d6
| 379959 ||  || — || May 1, 2006 || Kitt Peak || Spacewatch || — || align=right | 2.7 km || 
|-id=960 bgcolor=#d6d6d6
| 379960 ||  || — || December 21, 2003 || Kitt Peak || Spacewatch || — || align=right | 3.1 km || 
|-id=961 bgcolor=#d6d6d6
| 379961 ||  || — || October 8, 2007 || Catalina || CSS || EOS || align=right | 2.3 km || 
|-id=962 bgcolor=#d6d6d6
| 379962 ||  || — || March 8, 2005 || Kitt Peak || Spacewatch || — || align=right | 2.9 km || 
|-id=963 bgcolor=#d6d6d6
| 379963 ||  || — || December 27, 2003 || Kitt Peak || Spacewatch || — || align=right | 3.8 km || 
|-id=964 bgcolor=#C2FFFF
| 379964 ||  || — || December 15, 2004 || Kitt Peak || Spacewatch || L5 || align=right | 12 km || 
|-id=965 bgcolor=#C2FFFF
| 379965 ||  || — || April 14, 2008 || Mount Lemmon || Mount Lemmon Survey || L5 || align=right | 11 km || 
|-id=966 bgcolor=#d6d6d6
| 379966 ||  || — || March 18, 2004 || Socorro || LINEAR || — || align=right | 4.0 km || 
|-id=967 bgcolor=#d6d6d6
| 379967 ||  || — || May 25, 2006 || Mount Lemmon || Mount Lemmon Survey || EOS || align=right | 3.0 km || 
|-id=968 bgcolor=#E9E9E9
| 379968 ||  || — || October 8, 2008 || Catalina || CSS || — || align=right | 2.9 km || 
|-id=969 bgcolor=#d6d6d6
| 379969 ||  || — || September 19, 2001 || Socorro || LINEAR || THM || align=right | 2.7 km || 
|-id=970 bgcolor=#d6d6d6
| 379970 ||  || — || July 22, 1995 || Kitt Peak || Spacewatch || — || align=right | 4.3 km || 
|-id=971 bgcolor=#E9E9E9
| 379971 ||  || — || November 6, 2008 || Mount Lemmon || Mount Lemmon Survey || — || align=right | 1.8 km || 
|-id=972 bgcolor=#C2FFFF
| 379972 ||  || — || October 8, 1999 || Socorro || LINEAR || L5 || align=right | 13 km || 
|-id=973 bgcolor=#C2FFFF
| 379973 ||  || — || March 26, 1995 || Kitt Peak || Spacewatch || L5 || align=right | 12 km || 
|-id=974 bgcolor=#C2FFFF
| 379974 ||  || — || February 26, 2007 || Mount Lemmon || Mount Lemmon Survey || L5 || align=right | 9.7 km || 
|-id=975 bgcolor=#C2FFFF
| 379975 ||  || — || September 18, 2001 || Kitt Peak || Spacewatch || L5 || align=right | 7.7 km || 
|-id=976 bgcolor=#C2FFFF
| 379976 ||  || — || December 16, 2003 || Kitt Peak || Spacewatch || L5 || align=right | 12 km || 
|-id=977 bgcolor=#C2FFFF
| 379977 ||  || — || September 24, 2000 || Socorro || LINEAR || L5 || align=right | 15 km || 
|-id=978 bgcolor=#C2FFFF
| 379978 ||  || — || February 4, 2005 || Kitt Peak || Spacewatch || L5 || align=right | 8.7 km || 
|-id=979 bgcolor=#C2FFFF
| 379979 ||  || — || February 20, 2006 || Mount Lemmon || Mount Lemmon Survey || L5 || align=right | 12 km || 
|-id=980 bgcolor=#C2FFFF
| 379980 ||  || — || April 13, 1996 || Kitt Peak || Spacewatch || L5 || align=right | 11 km || 
|-id=981 bgcolor=#d6d6d6
| 379981 ||  || — || October 10, 2007 || Mount Lemmon || Mount Lemmon Survey || — || align=right | 4.6 km || 
|-id=982 bgcolor=#d6d6d6
| 379982 ||  || — || October 20, 2007 || Mount Lemmon || Mount Lemmon Survey || HYG || align=right | 3.5 km || 
|-id=983 bgcolor=#C2FFFF
| 379983 ||  || — || April 22, 2010 || WISE || WISE || L5 || align=right | 7.5 km || 
|-id=984 bgcolor=#C2FFFF
| 379984 ||  || — || March 14, 2007 || Mount Lemmon || Mount Lemmon Survey || L5 || align=right | 8.2 km || 
|-id=985 bgcolor=#C2FFFF
| 379985 ||  || — || January 26, 2006 || Mount Lemmon || Mount Lemmon Survey || L5 || align=right | 8.2 km || 
|-id=986 bgcolor=#C2FFFF
| 379986 ||  || — || March 12, 2008 || Kitt Peak || Spacewatch || L5 || align=right | 7.7 km || 
|-id=987 bgcolor=#fefefe
| 379987 ||  || — || April 29, 2003 || Socorro || LINEAR || — || align=right | 1.2 km || 
|-id=988 bgcolor=#d6d6d6
| 379988 ||  || — || June 13, 2005 || Mount Lemmon || Mount Lemmon Survey || — || align=right | 4.0 km || 
|-id=989 bgcolor=#d6d6d6
| 379989 ||  || — || February 19, 2009 || Catalina || CSS || — || align=right | 3.9 km || 
|-id=990 bgcolor=#d6d6d6
| 379990 ||  || — || July 4, 2005 || Mount Lemmon || Mount Lemmon Survey || — || align=right | 3.5 km || 
|-id=991 bgcolor=#d6d6d6
| 379991 ||  || — || December 6, 1996 || Kitt Peak || Spacewatch || — || align=right | 3.6 km || 
|-id=992 bgcolor=#E9E9E9
| 379992 ||  || — || June 21, 1999 || Kitt Peak || Spacewatch || — || align=right | 2.0 km || 
|-id=993 bgcolor=#fefefe
| 379993 ||  || — || March 25, 2010 || Mount Lemmon || Mount Lemmon Survey || NYS || align=right data-sort-value="0.71" | 710 m || 
|-id=994 bgcolor=#fefefe
| 379994 ||  || — || March 2, 1995 || Kitt Peak || Spacewatch || MAS || align=right data-sort-value="0.74" | 740 m || 
|-id=995 bgcolor=#E9E9E9
| 379995 ||  || — || September 20, 2006 || Kitt Peak || Spacewatch || — || align=right | 2.8 km || 
|-id=996 bgcolor=#fefefe
| 379996 ||  || — || August 24, 2007 || Kitt Peak || Spacewatch || — || align=right data-sort-value="0.85" | 850 m || 
|-id=997 bgcolor=#C2FFFF
| 379997 ||  || — || May 8, 2006 || Mount Lemmon || Mount Lemmon Survey || L4 || align=right | 9.7 km || 
|-id=998 bgcolor=#C2FFFF
| 379998 ||  || — || August 24, 2007 || Kitt Peak || Spacewatch || L4 || align=right | 9.2 km || 
|-id=999 bgcolor=#E9E9E9
| 379999 ||  || — || April 18, 2009 || Mount Lemmon || Mount Lemmon Survey || HOF || align=right | 3.0 km || 
|-id=000 bgcolor=#E9E9E9
| 380000 ||  || — || April 10, 2005 || Mount Lemmon || Mount Lemmon Survey || — || align=right data-sort-value="0.92" | 920 m || 
|}

References

External links 
 Discovery Circumstances: Numbered Minor Planets (375001)–(380000) (IAU Minor Planet Center)

0379